= Bobbin lace =

Handmade lace

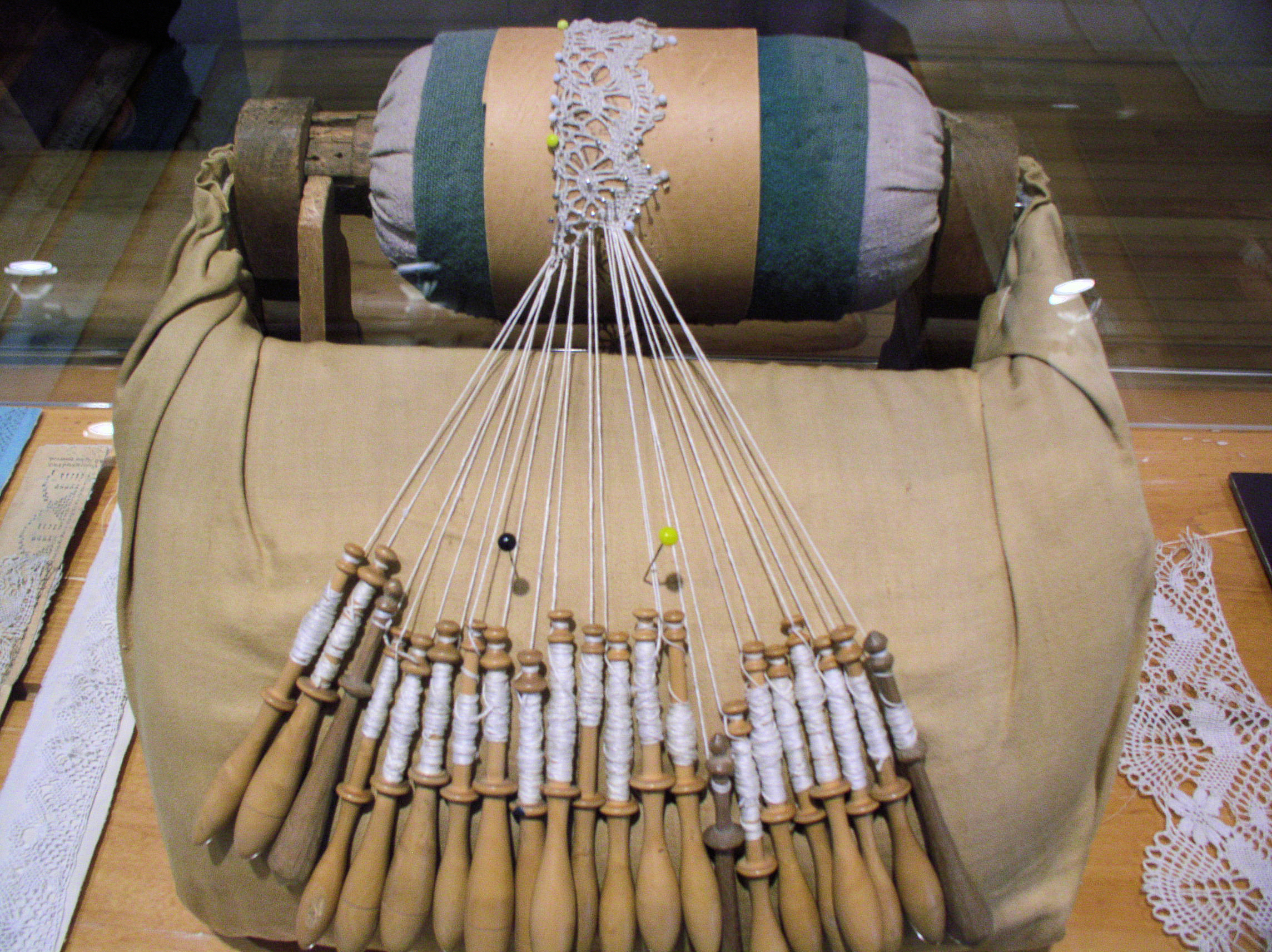
Bobbin lace in progress at the Musée des Ursulines de Québec

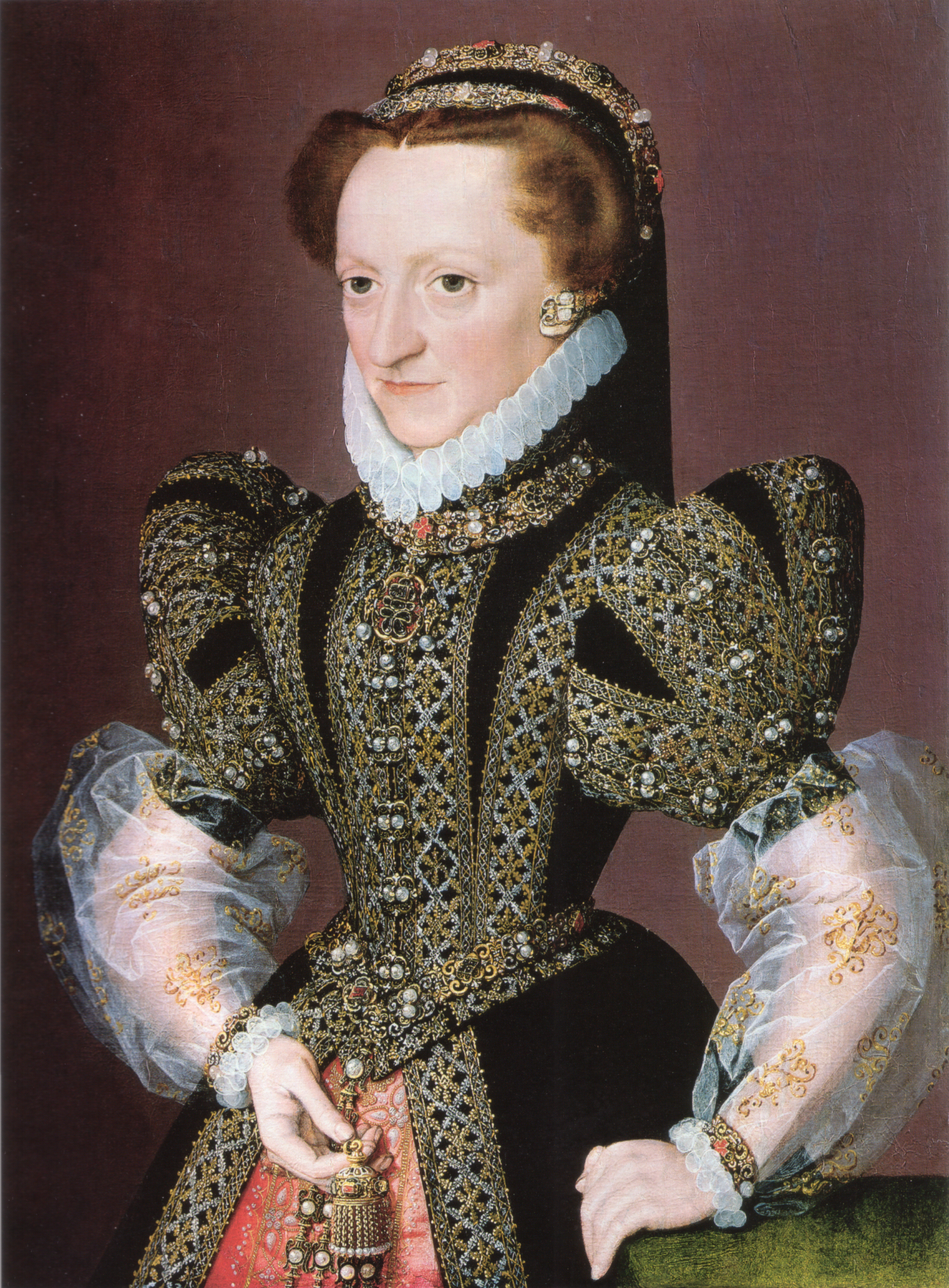
Early bobbin lace in gold and silver thread, c. 1570.

Bobbin lace is a lace textile made by braiding and twisting lengths of thread, which are wound on bobbins to manage them. As the work progresses, the weaving is held in place with pins set in a lace pillow, the placement of the pins usually determined by a pattern or pricking pinned on the pillow.

Bobbin lace is also known as pillow lace, because it was worked on a pillow, and bone lace, because early bobbins were made of bone or ivory.

Bobbin lace is one of the two major categories of handmade laces, the other being needle lace, derived from earlier cutwork and reticella.

== Origin ==
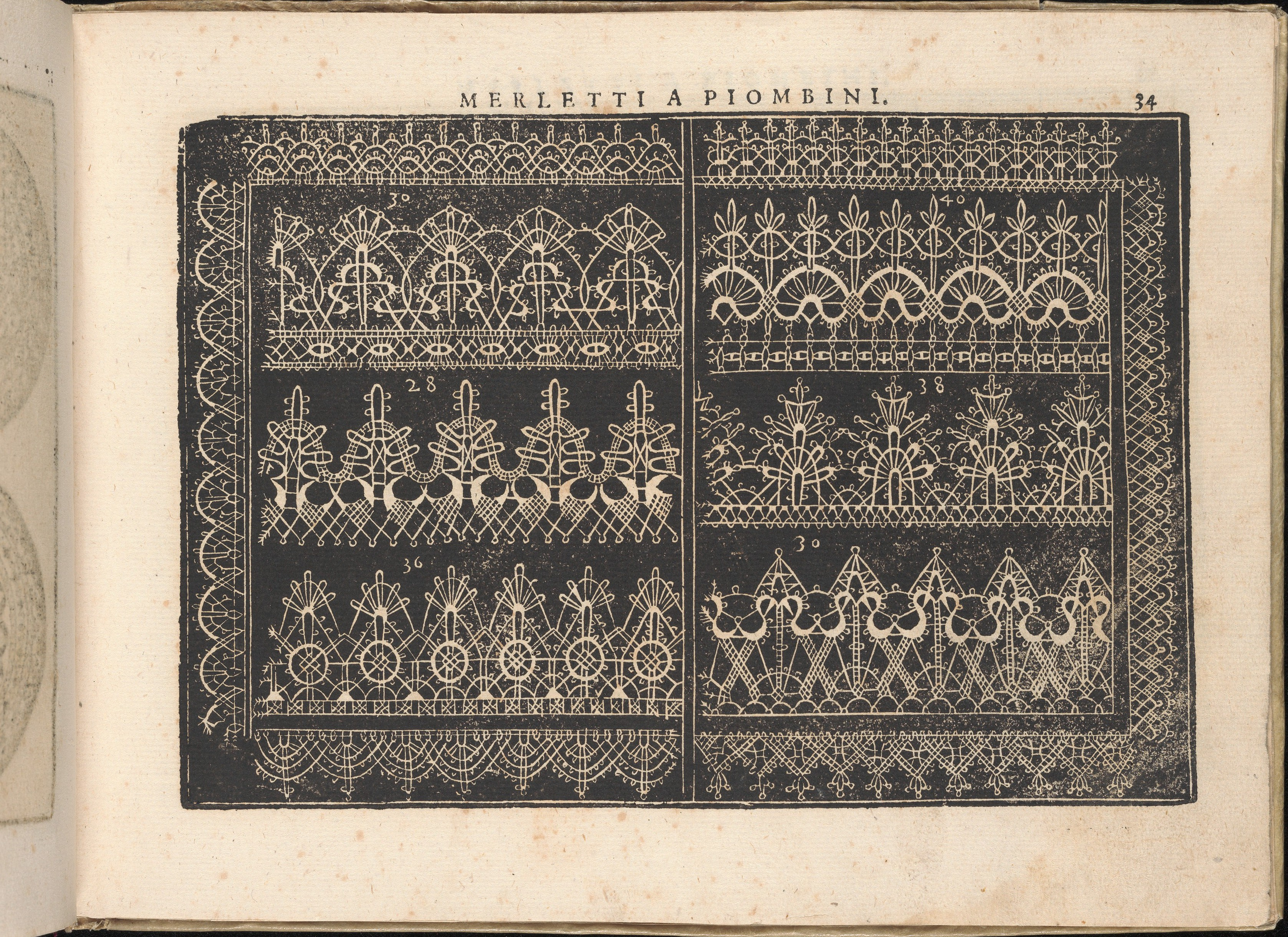
Fiore D'Ogni Virtu Per le Nobili Et Honeste Matrone, page 34. Isabella Parasole

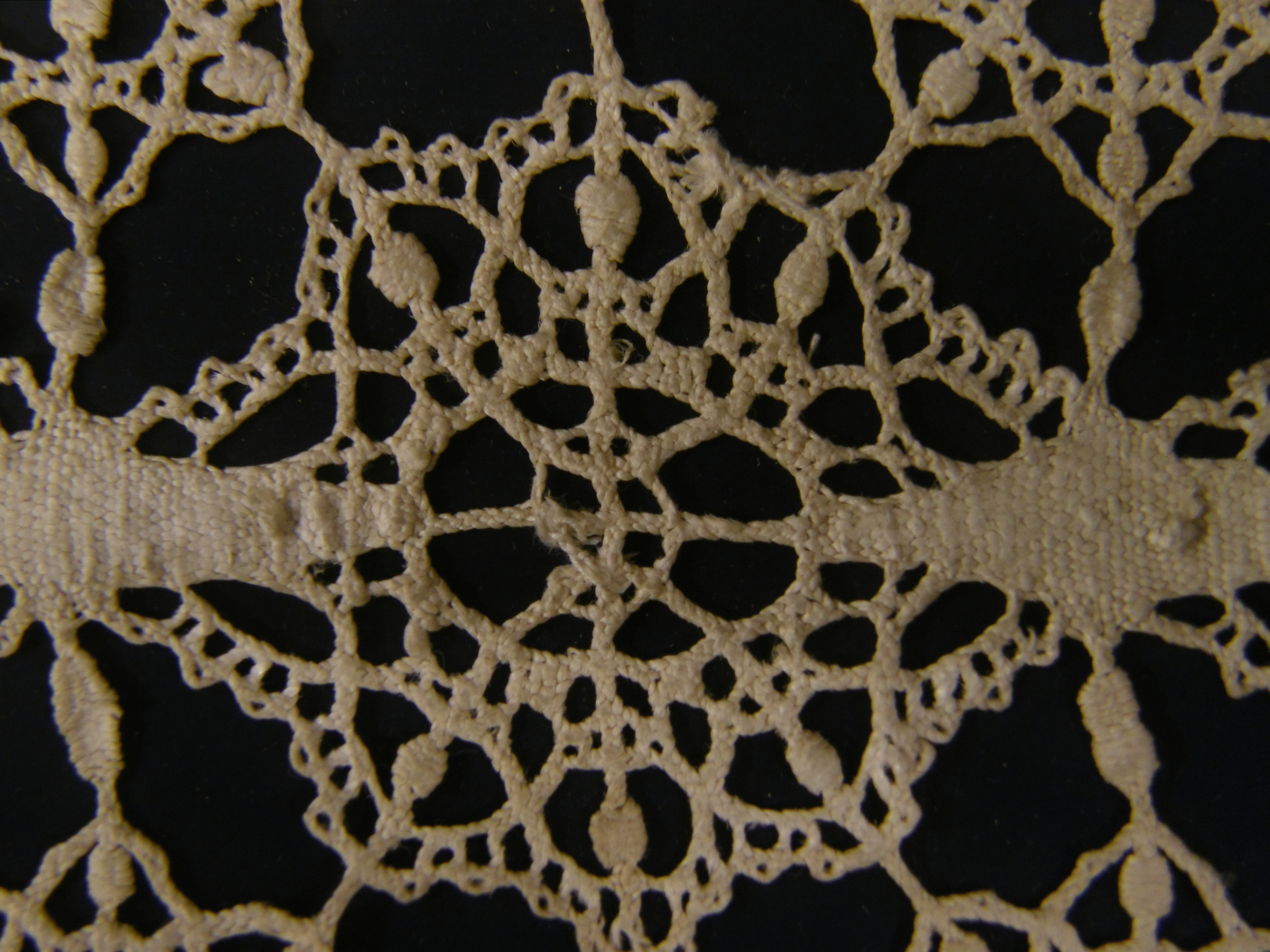
BLW Bobbin lace - detail

A will of 1493 by the Milanese Sforza family mentions lace created with twelve bobbins. There are two books that represent the earliest known pattern descriptions for bobbin lace, Le Pompe from Venice and Nüw Modelbuch from Zürich. Patterns from Nüw Modelbuch can be examined with commentary, working diagrams, and completed examples to understand the styles. Other popular lace pattern books were produced by Isabella Parasole, which included patterns for reticella, needle lace and bobbin lace designs. Other pattern books of this period include Cesare Vecellio and Bartolomeo Danieli.

Bobbin lace evolved from passementerie or braid-making in 16th-century Italy. Genoa was famous for its braids, hence it is not surprising to find bobbin lace developed in the city. It traveled along with the Spanish troops through Europe. Coarse passements of gold and silver-wrapped threads or colored silks gradually became finer, and later bleached linen yarn was used to make both braids and edgings.

The making of bobbin lace was easier to learn than the elaborate cutwork of the 16th century, and the tools and materials for making linen bobbin lace were inexpensive. There was a ready market for bobbin lace of all qualities, and women throughout Europe soon took up the craft which earned a better income than spinning, sewing, weaving or other home-based textile arts. Bobbin lace-making was established in charity schools, almshouses, and convents.

In the 17th century, the textile centers of Flanders and Normandy eclipsed Italy as the premier sources for fine bobbin lace, but until the Industrial Revolution and the coming of mechanization hand-lacemaking continued to be practiced throughout Europe, suffering only in those periods of simplicity when lace itself fell out of fashion.

Some skilled lace makers work to re-create older lace patterns based on period portraiture and extant lace samples. On paintings that have sufficient detail, entire pieces can be reconstructed by lacemakers who understand the early structural techniques and details.

== Structure ==
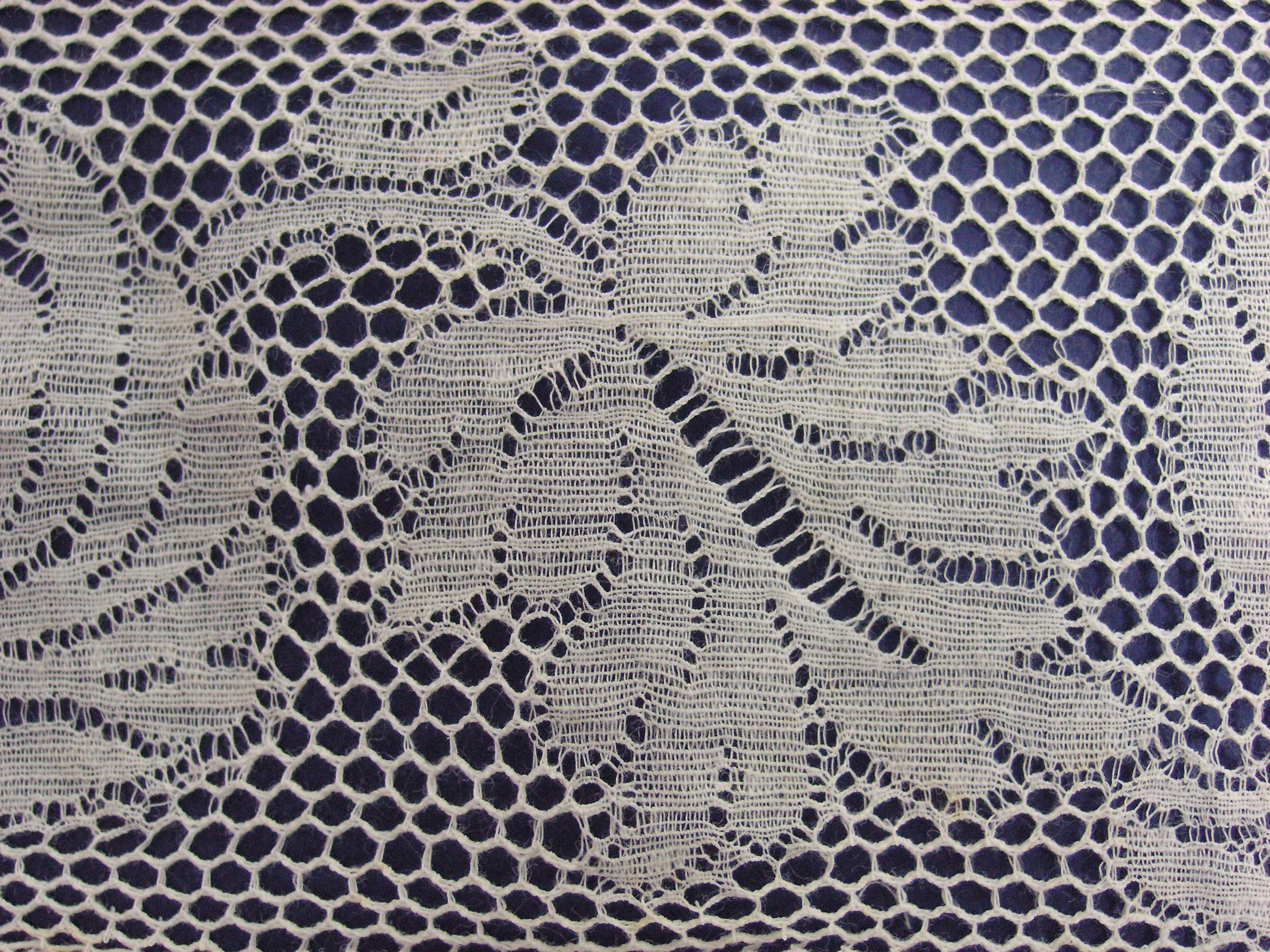
An example of lace made of a net ground and a flower motif worked in cloth stitch

Sub-categories of bobbin lace based on structure include: mesh ground lace, guipure or braided lace, sectional lace, and tape lace. Mesh ground laces have a background of repeated, open stitches and motifs worked in more solid stitches. The mesh is called the ground or réseau. The solid sections are called the toilé. Sometimes a slightly thicker thread called a gimp or cordonnet is used to outline the toile.

Guipure laces are made of intersecting plaits and often feature tallies and picots. Sectional lace is made up of motifs that are worked separately then joined into one piece. Tape lace is made up of thin woven strips that are shaped into a design then stitched in place with joining threads.

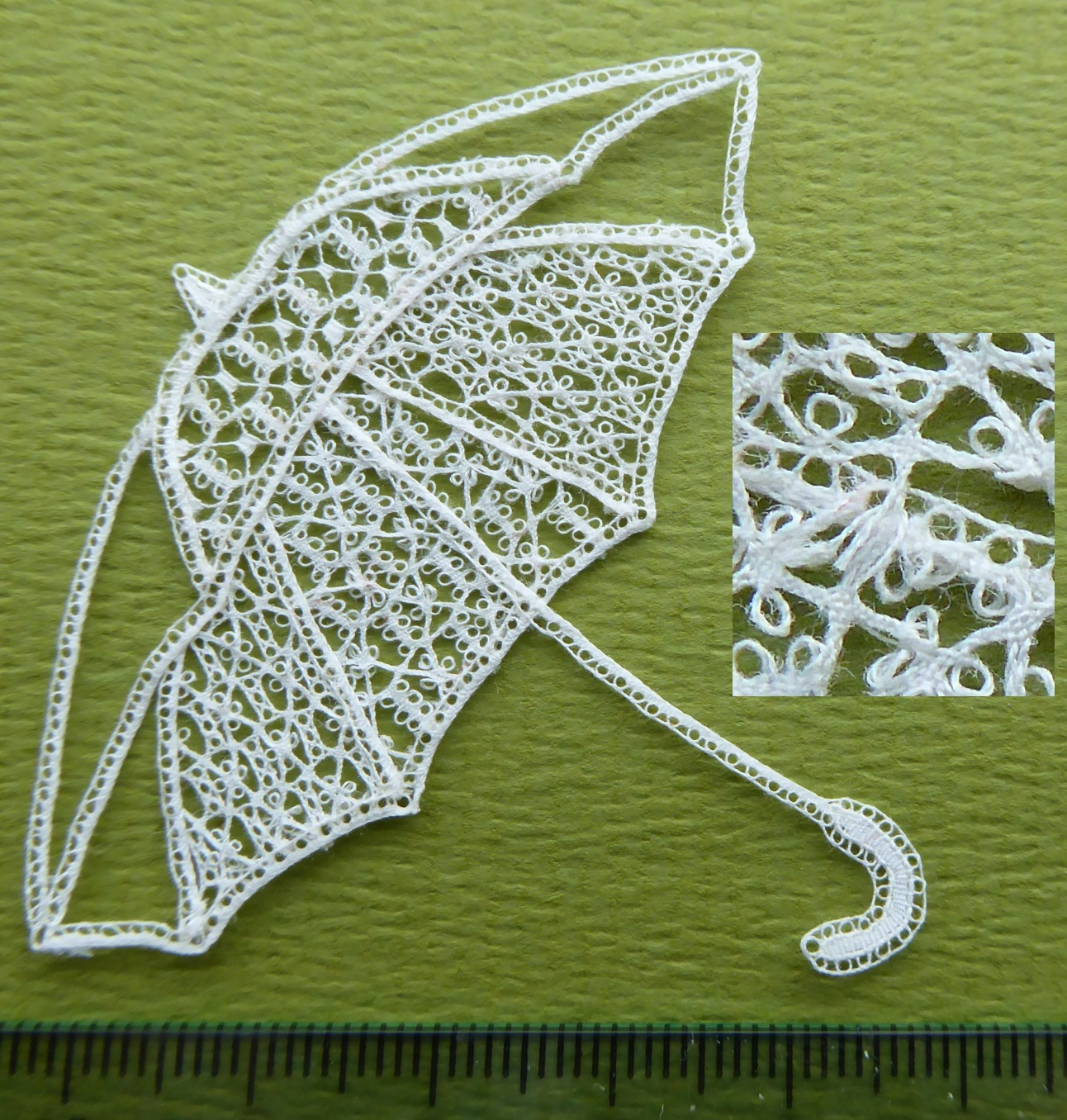
The close up of the back shows the fillings are sewn onto the ribs and tied off

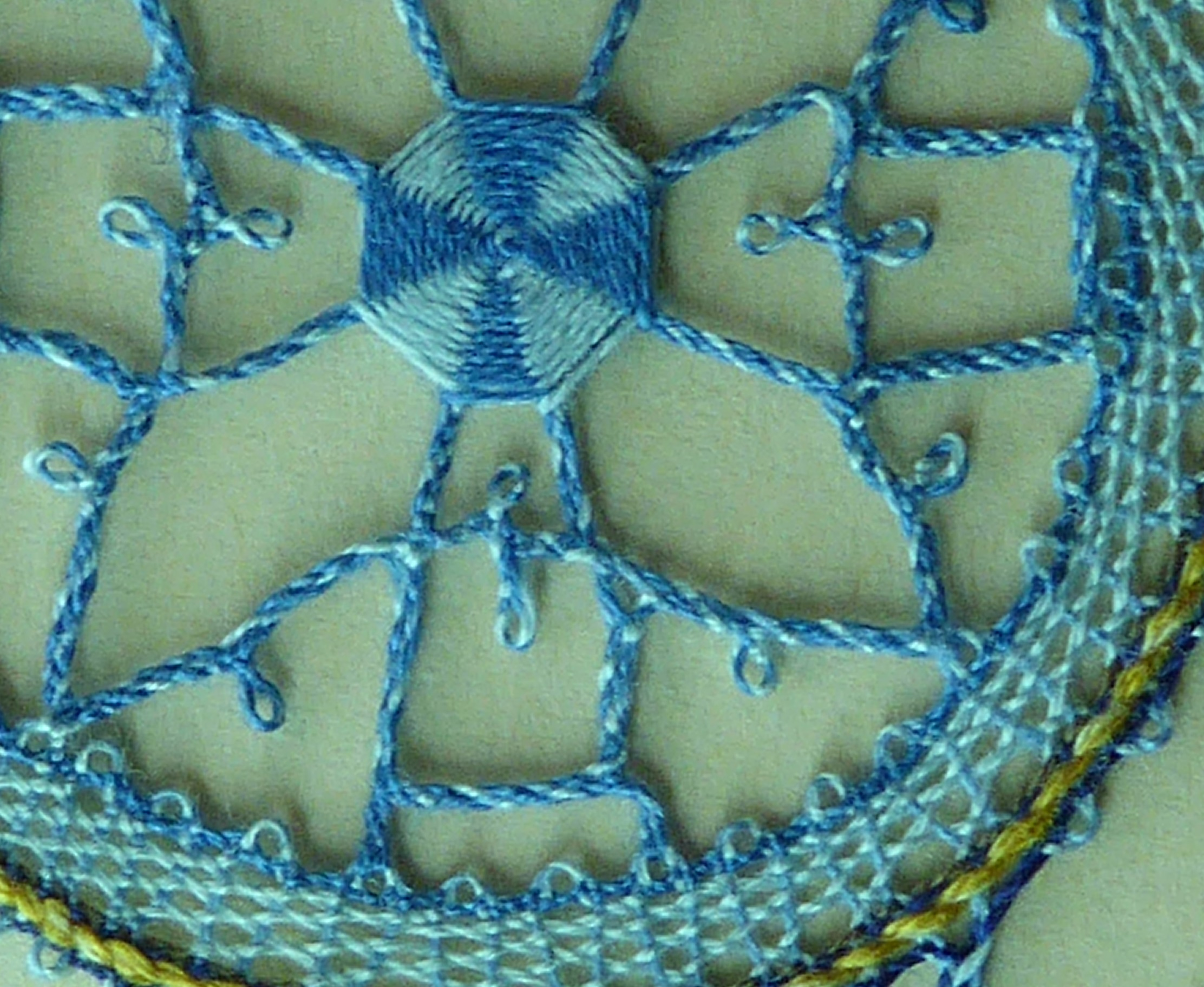
A single plait can choose a clever path to construct a filling with sewings but without tying off

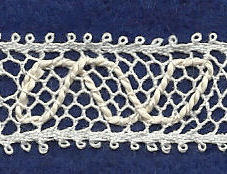
mesh (or ground) with a solitary gimp

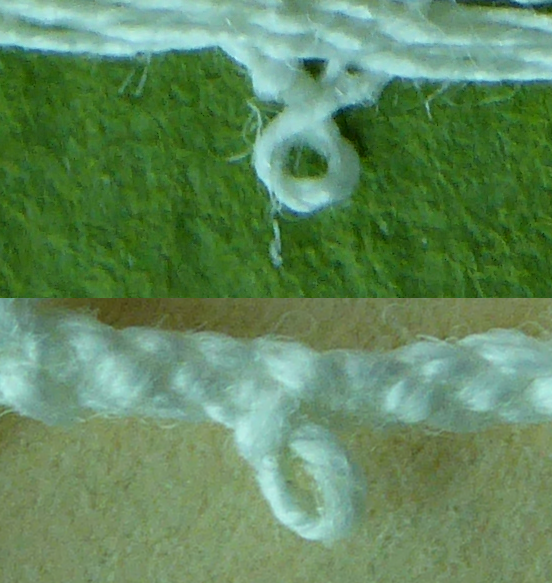
Picots. Top: double threaded, bottom single threaded.

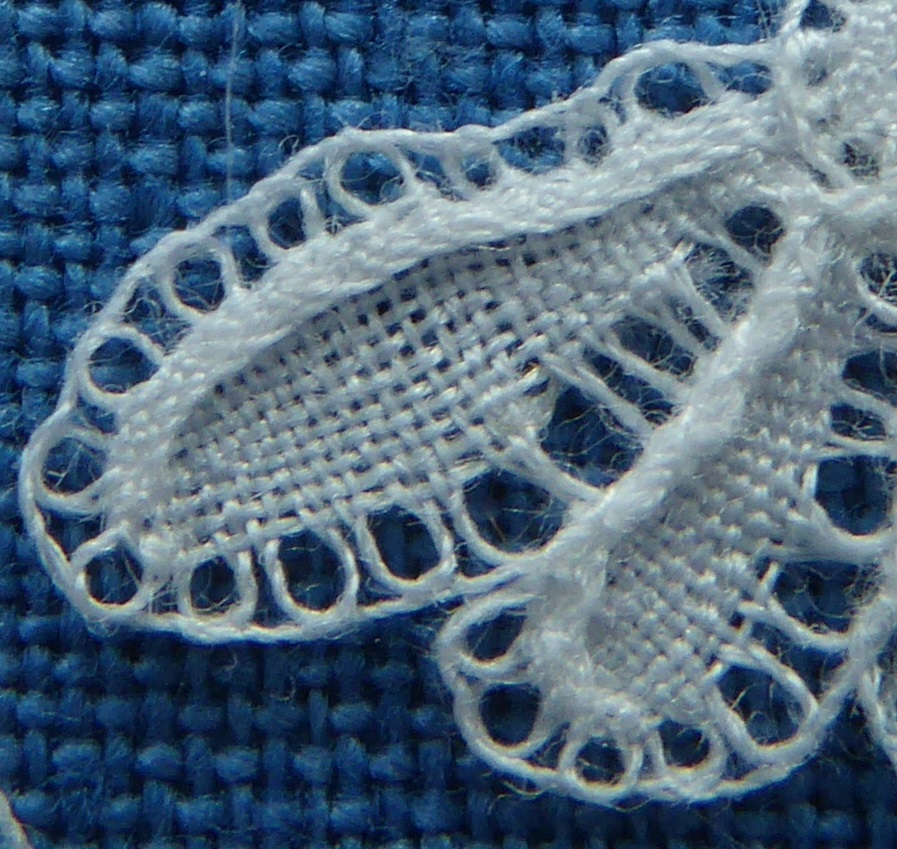
Raised work, a rib on top of the left section, a roll on top of the right section

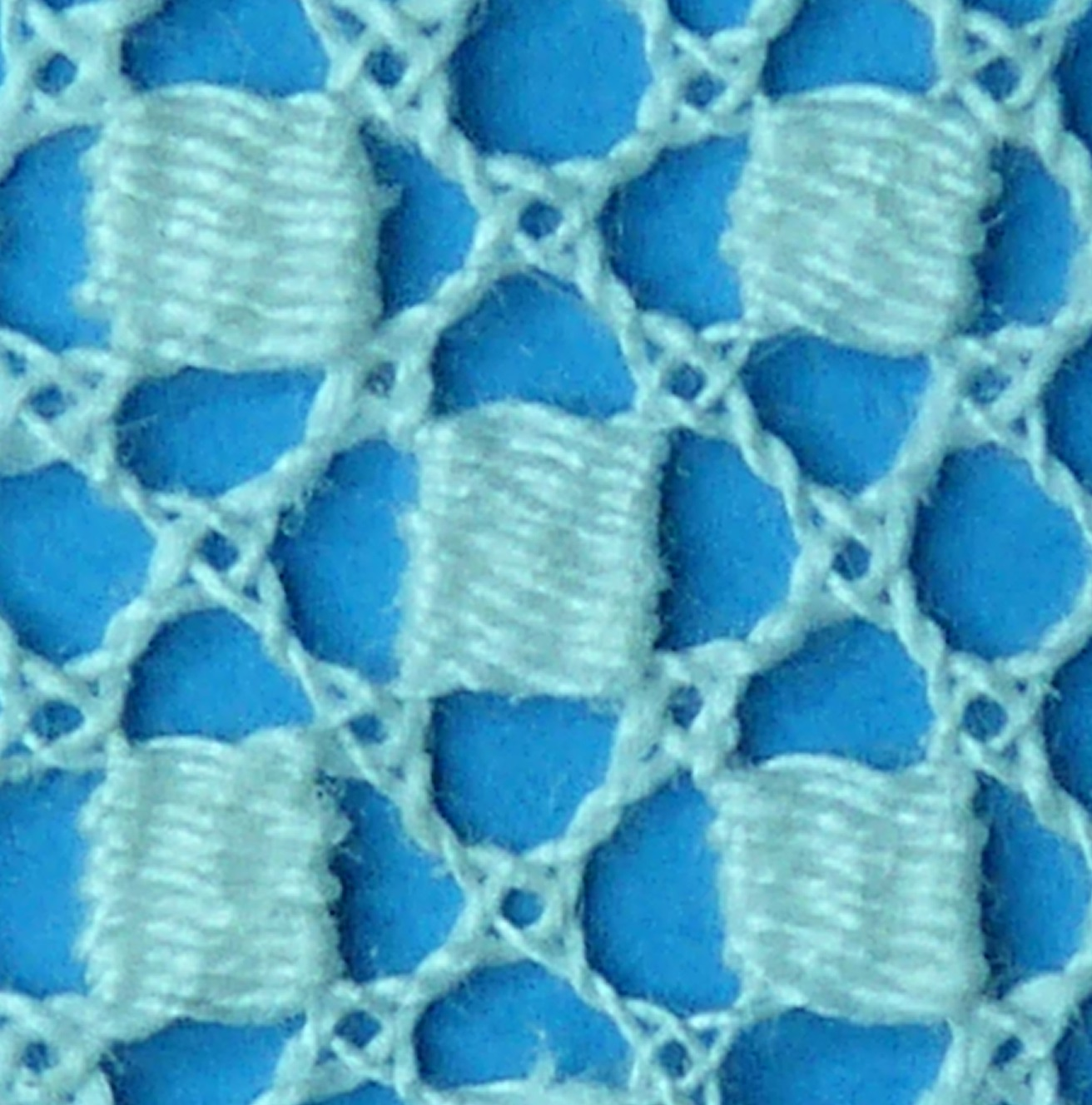
Rectangular tallies

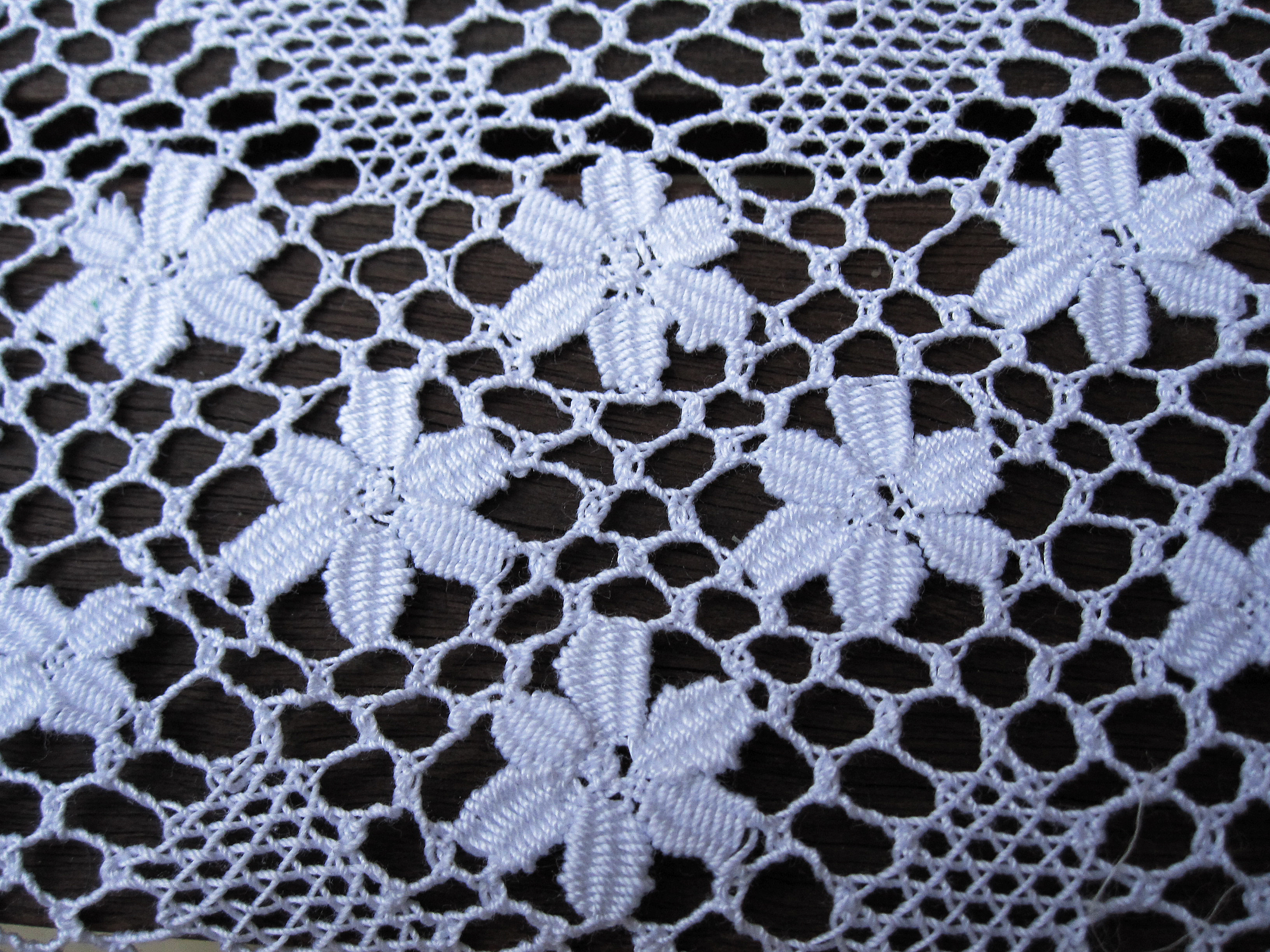
Another common shape of tallies arranged as flower petals

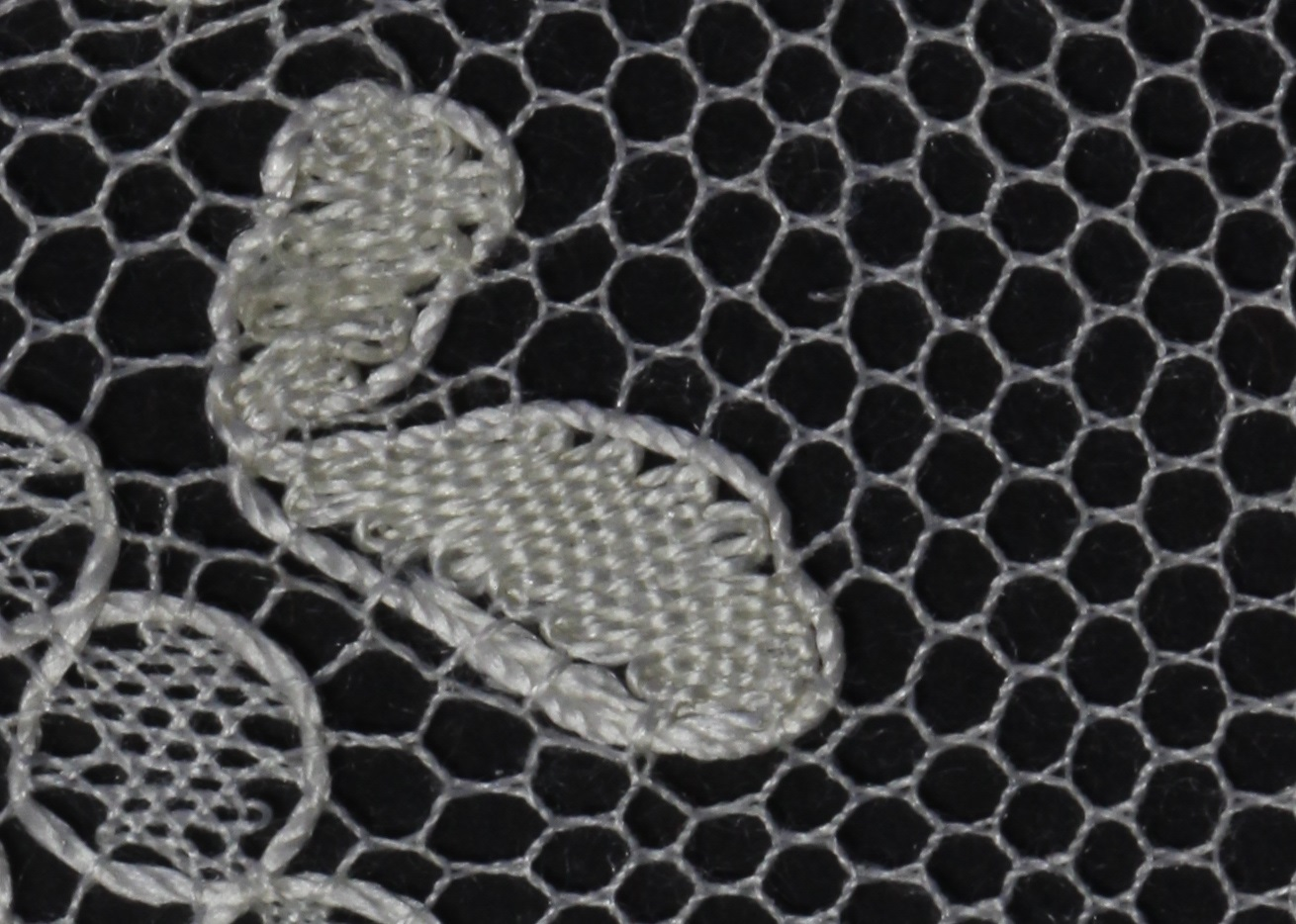
Mesh ground motif; toilé with a gimp, corner of half stitch, petals of cloth stitch

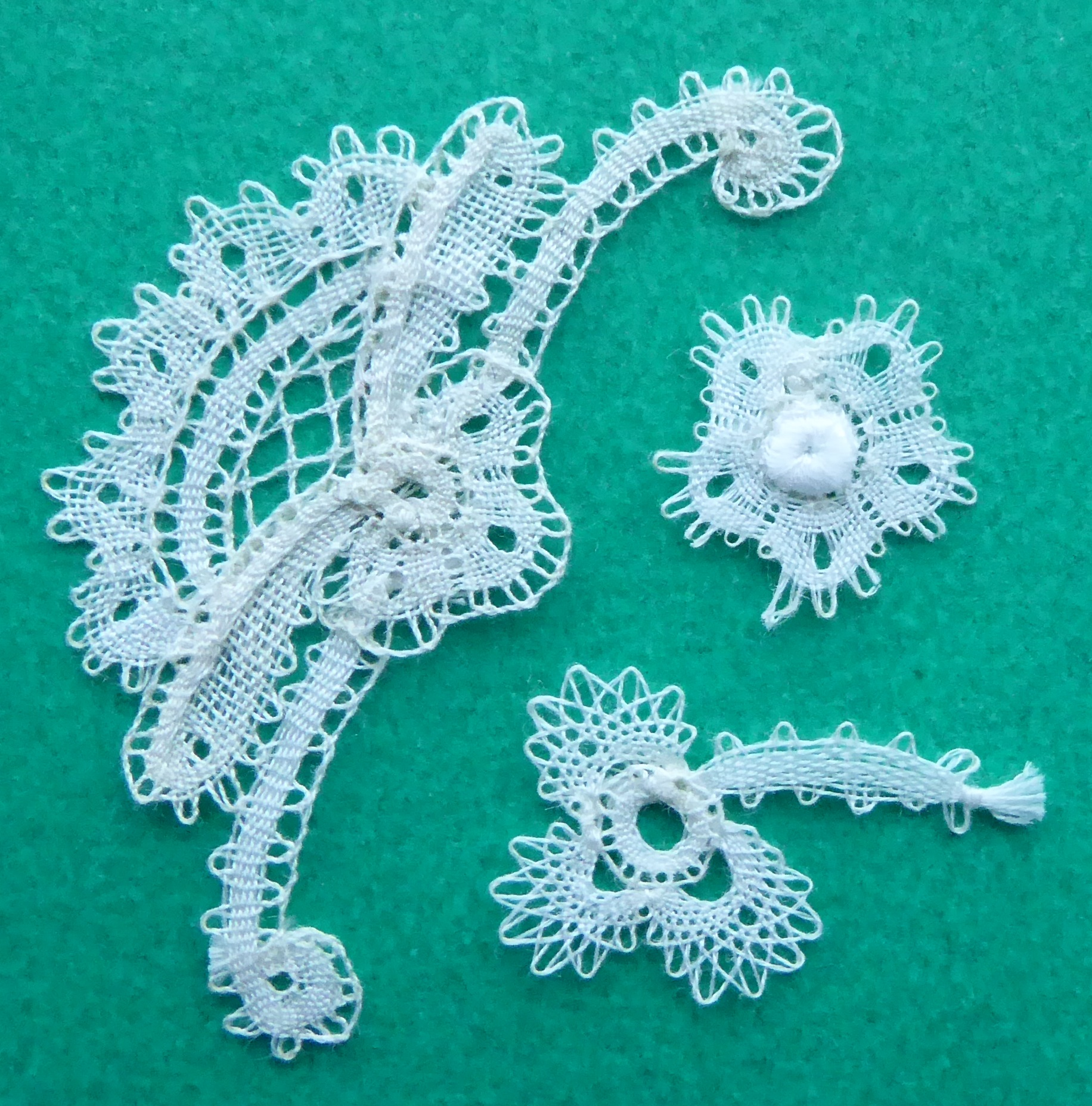
part lace motifs, before being assembled

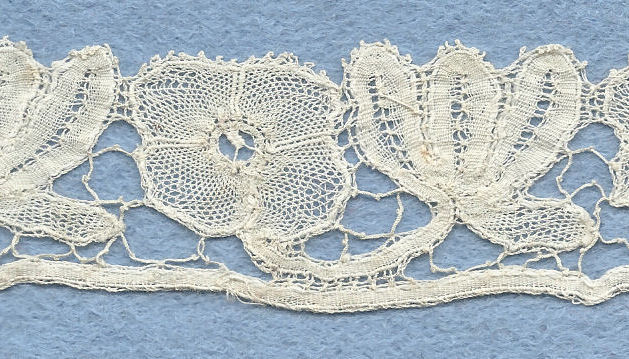
completed part lace

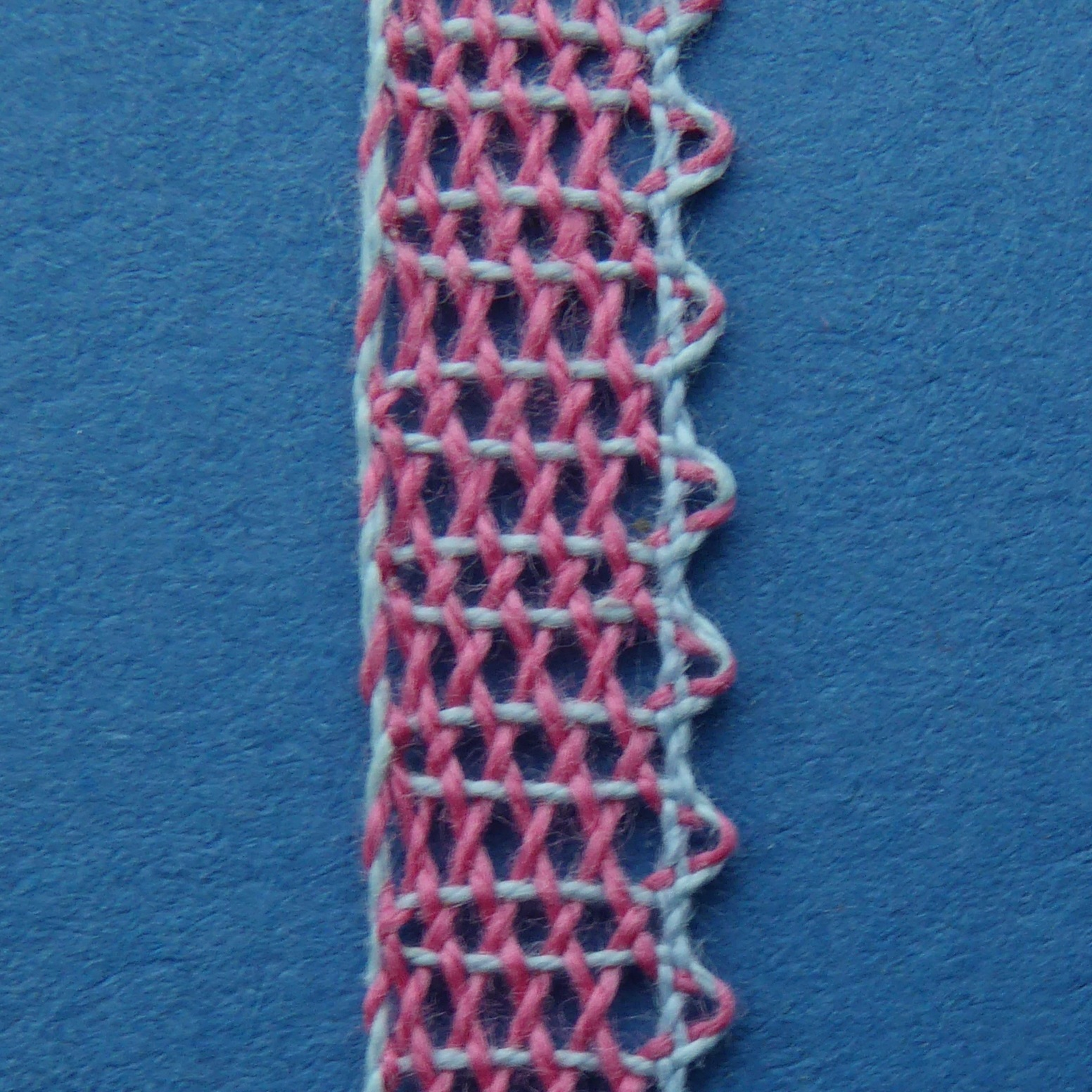
A Tape (or braid) with footside on the left and a headside on the right

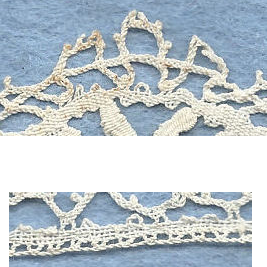
top headside bottom footside

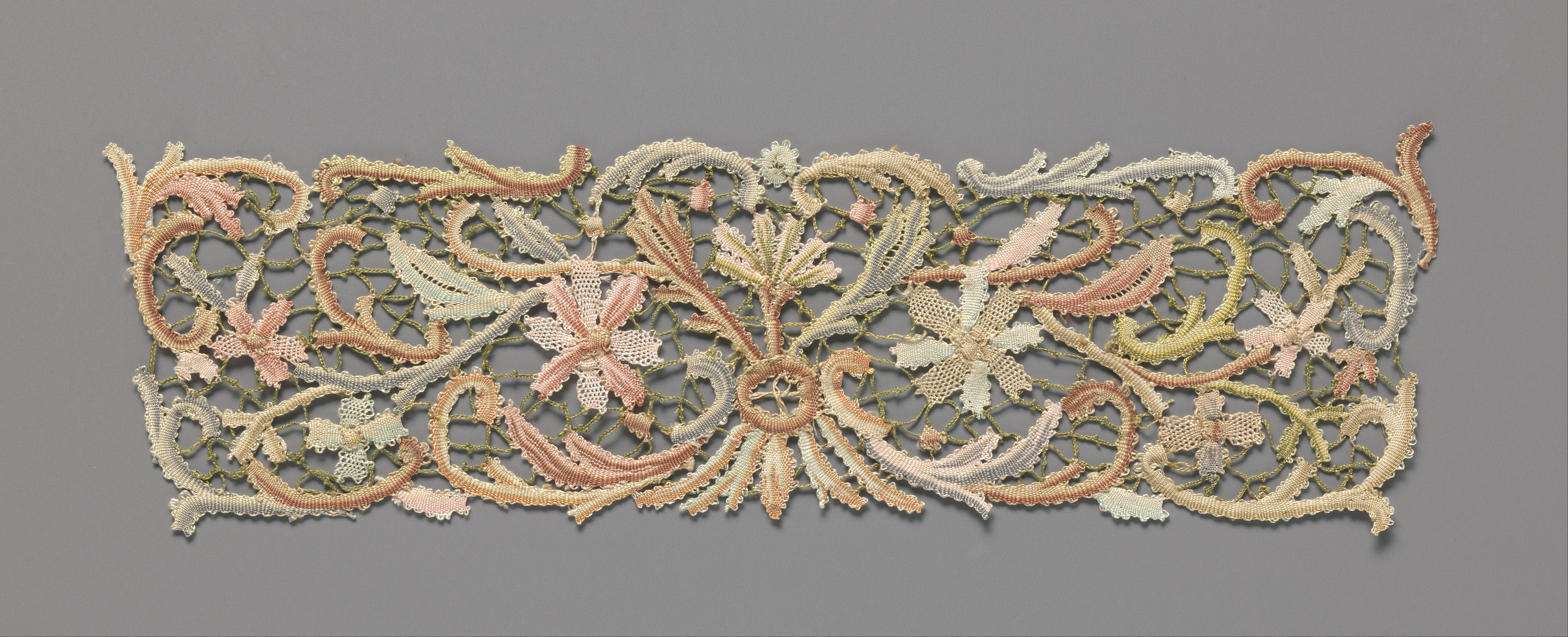
Polychrome lace by Michelangelo Jesurum combines styles and colored threads for effect.

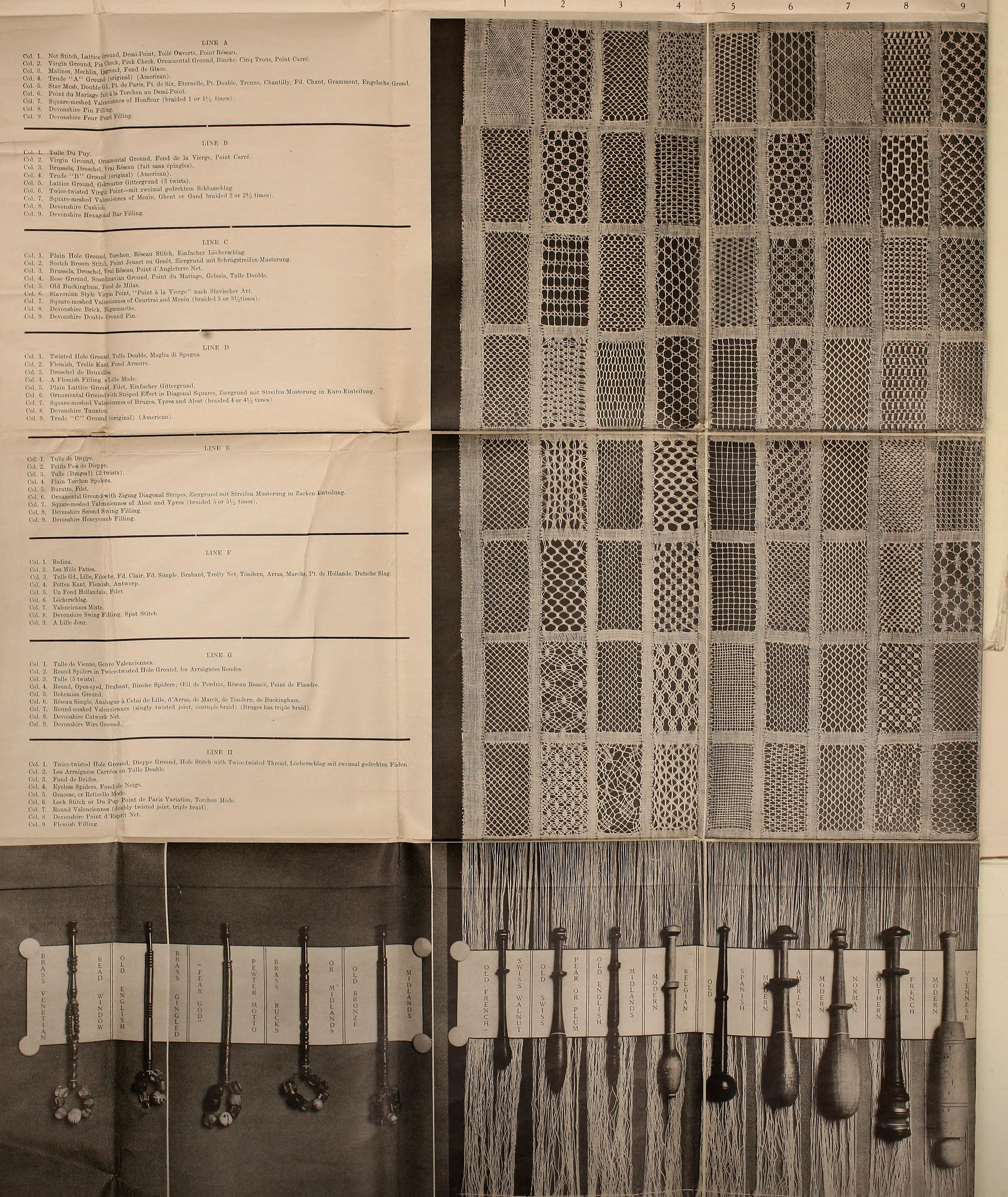
A lace guide for makers and collectors; Gertrude Whiting's sampler (1920)

== Traditional types ==
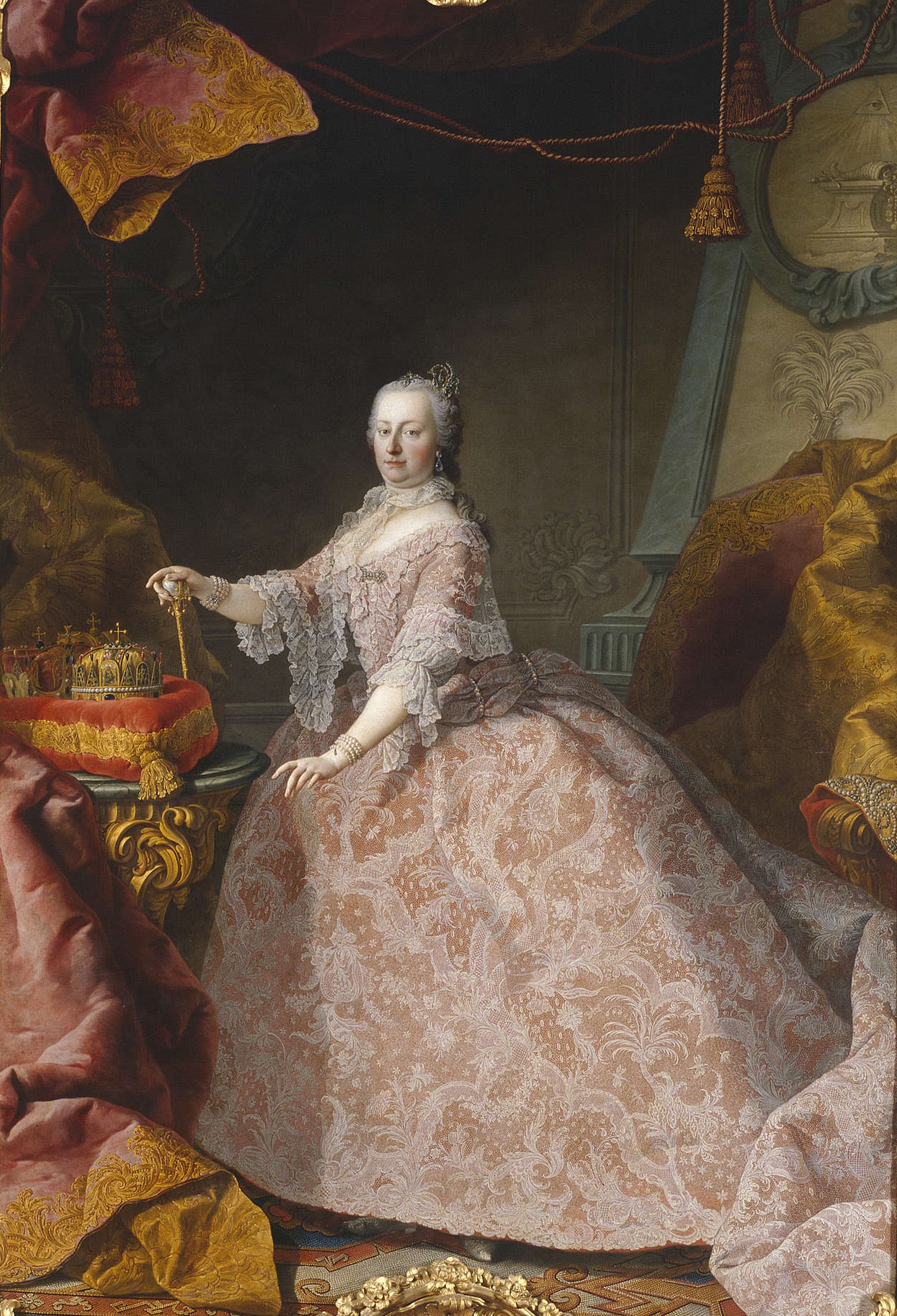
State portrait of Maria Theresa, which depicts her as the "first lady of Europe" in a precious dress of Brabant bobbin lace. (by Martin van Meytens, c. 1752)

Many styles of lace were made in the heyday of lacemaking (approximately the 16th–18th centuries) before machine-made lace became available. Types of bobbin lace are usually named after the city they originated or were manufactured in.

Types of bobbin lace
Name	Country of origin	Distinction		Example
Mesh ground			Ground type	
Antwerp	Belgium	Flower pot motifs, gimp	Double ground, rose ground	
Arras	France	Simple floral motifs, gimp	Point ground	
Beveren	France	Straight picoted headside, floral motifs, gimp	Point ground	
Binche	Belgium	2-inch wide straight strips, spot patterns	Snowflake ground	
Blonde	France	Undyed silk thread, floral motifs, gimp	Point ground	
Bucks point	England	Naturalistic motifs, gimp, sometimes honeycomb filling	Point ground	
Chantilly	France	Silk, often black, gimp, floral motifs	Point ground or double ground	
Cogne	Italy	Freehand, made using pillow horse		
Flanders	Belgium		Rose ground	
Le Puy	France	Black, cartouches (frames), sometimes guipure	Hexagons and triangles with picots	
Lille	France	Motifs only using gimp	Point ground	
Ipswich	America	Gimp, floral motifs	Point ground	
Mechlin	Belgium	Floral motifs, gimp	Mechlin ground	
Mundillo	Puerto Rico, Panama	Geometric motifs, tallies		
Paris	France	Floral motifs	Double ground	
Valenciennes	France	Floral motifs, no gimp, fine thread	Plaited diamond (Valenciennes ground) or snowflake	
Torchon	England	Geometric motifs	Torchon or rose ground	
Tønder	Denmark	Honeycomb stitch filling, floral motifs, square tallies	Point ground	
Guipure
Bedfordshire	England	Cloth stitch trails, diamond ground with picots		
Cluny	France	Geometric motifs, radial wheatears		
Genoese	Italy	Coarse thread, geometric motifs, tallies, sometimes punto in aria imitation		
Maltese	Malta	Made on tall upright pillow, often silk thread, Maltese cross, wheatears		
Sectional			Joining method	
Bruges	Belgium	Floral motifs, scrolls	Plaits	
Brussels	Belgium	Naturalistic motifs	Stitches picked up and ground worked around	
Honiton	England	Scrolls, naturalistic motifs, sometimes gimp	Fastened onto net	
Milanese	Italy	Closely worked stitches, scrolls	Plaits	
Rosaline	Belgium	Rose motifs		
Tape
Idrija	Slovenia	Trailing patterns	Plaited, joined with crochet hook	
Schneeberg	Germany			

== Contemporary laces ==
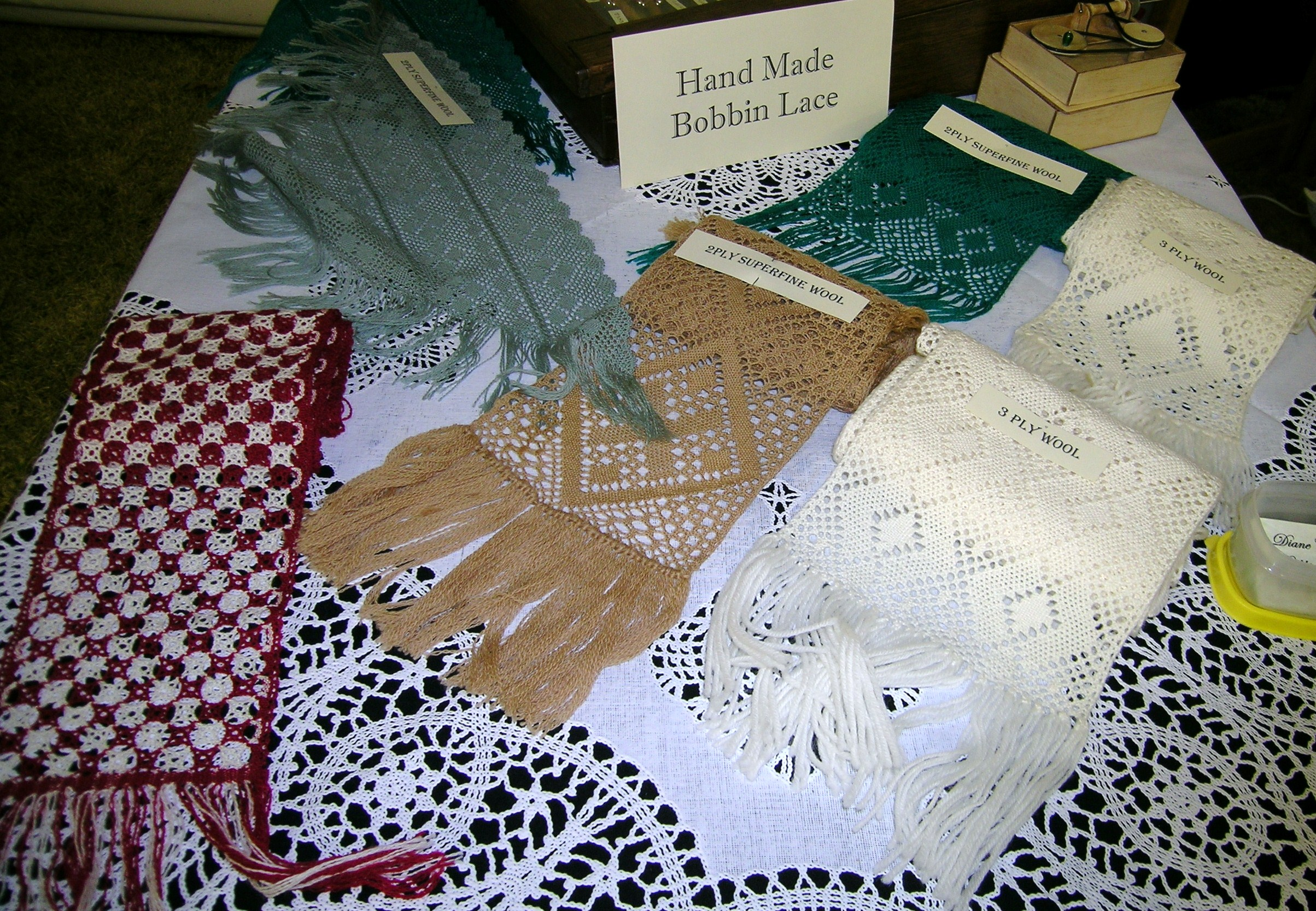
Contemporary handmade woollen bobbin lace articles, Wool Expo, Armidale NSW. Pale green lace is made of 2 ply wool.

The advent of machine-made lace at first pushed lace-makers into more complicated designs beyond the capabilities of early machines, then simpler designs so they could compete on price, and finally pushed them out of business almost entirely.

The resurgence of lace-making is a recent phenomenon and is mostly done as a hobby. Lacemaking groups still meet in regions as varied as Devonshire, England and Orange County, California. In the European towns where lace was once a major industry or popular artisanry, especially in Belgium, England, Spain (Camariñas and Almagro), Portugal (Azores, Caminha, Lagos, Nisa, Olhão, Peniche, Póvoa de Varzim, Sesimbra, Setúbal, Silves, Viana do Castelo, Vila do Conde and Viseu (Farminhão), being known as Renda de Bilros), France and Slovenia lacemakers still demonstrate the craft and sell their wares, though their customer base has shifted from the wealthy nobility to the curious tourist.

Still new types of lace are being developed such as the 3D Rosalibre and a colored version of Milanese lace by borrowing rolls from Duchesse lace to store various shades and colors. Other artists are giving grounds a major role by distorting and varying stitches, pin distances and thread sizes or colours. The variations are explored by experimentation and mathematics and algorithms. The lace maintaining its shape without stiffening is no longer a requirement. Inspiring journals, guilds and foundations show that old techniques with a new twist can challenge young people to create works that can definitely classify as art.

A Dutch design graduate in 2006 discovered bobbin lace was a technique to make a fancy fence. The first fences became museum pieces. The fences are now produced in Bangalore by concrete rebar plaiters.

== Tools ==
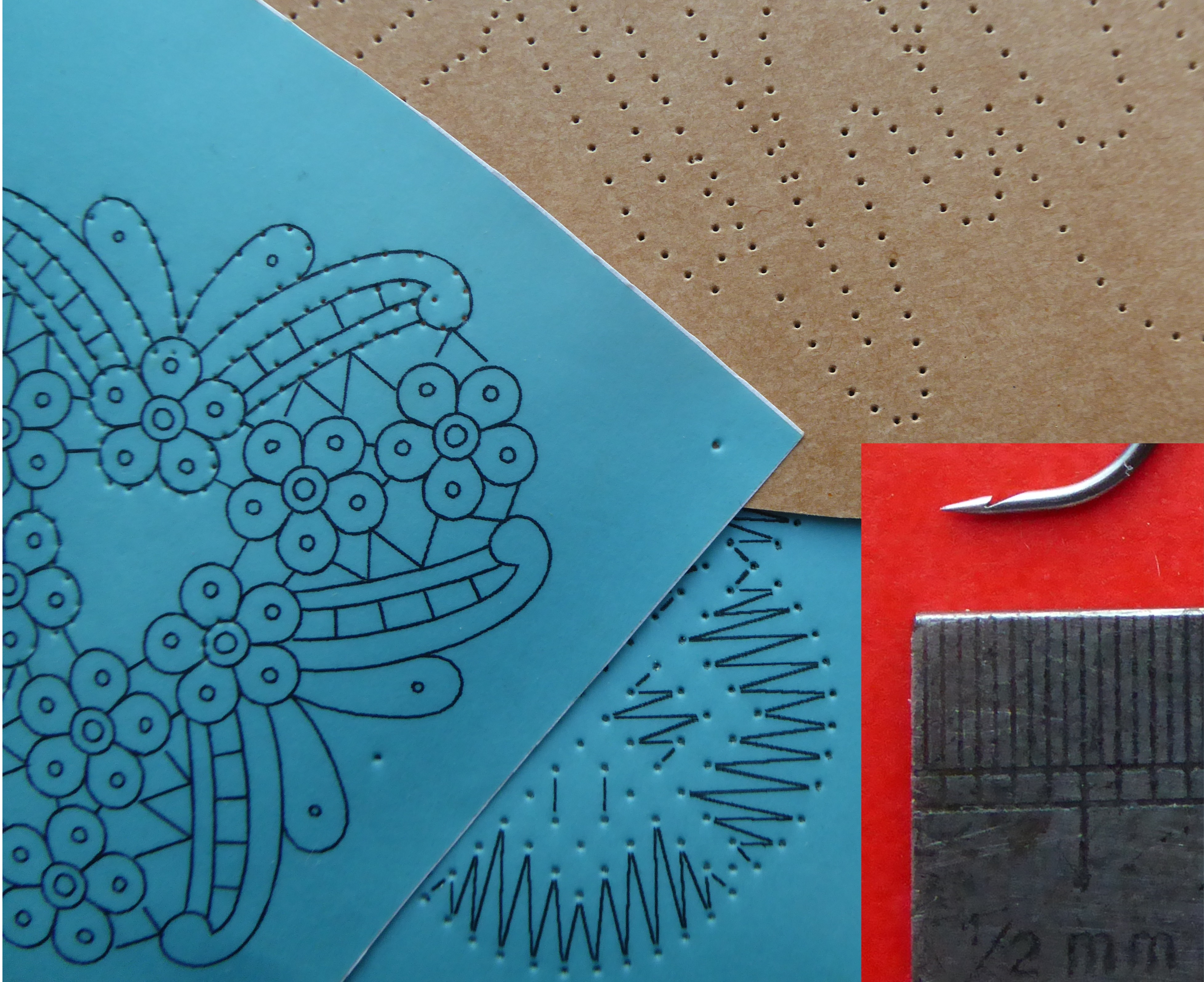
prickings for various types of lace and a very fine hook

Bobbin lace maker presents bobbin lace made in Myjava (Slovakia)

The major tools to make bobbin lace are a pillow, bobbins, pins and prickings. The part laces also require a crochet hook, very fine types of lace require very fine hooks. There are different types of pillows and bobbins linked to areas, eras and type of lace.

=== Bobbins ===
Bobbins, which are traditionally made of wood or bone, are used to hold the thread. They come in different shapes, often associated with certain types of lace. The parts of a bobbin are the neck, which is where the thread is wound, a head, where thread is hitched to keep it from coming unwound, and the shank, which is used as a handle. Bobbins from England may also have a beaded spangle at the end of the shank, which makes the bobbin heavier and helps with tensioning the thread. Bobbins are usually 3 1/2 - 4 inches long, though they may be shorter or longer. Bobbins are wound and used in pairs. Bobbin collection is a common aspect of the hobby for many lace makers. Within the lace community, commemorative bobbins designating annual meetings, special anniversaries, or historic events are frequently offered which become collector's items.

There are many types of bobbins, including:

- Belgian bobbins: They have a single head and a bulbous rounding near the end of the shank that helps with tensioning threads.
- Binche bobbins: The round bulb near the end of the shank is small, making these bobbins good for fine, straight laces.
- East Midlands bobbins: These double-headed bobbins are slender and spangled. They are also called Bucks or Midlands bobbins.
- Honiton bobbins: Honiton bobbins are straight below the single head, and the end of the shank comes to a blunt point, which helps with sewing. They may be called a lace stick.
- Square bobbins: Square bobbins have a shank with flattened sides, which makes it easier to keep them from rolling on the pillow.
- Portuguese bobbins: The bobbin is an elongated pear-shaped wooden artefact where the thread is wrapped.
- Bone bobbins are sometimes decorated with names, commemorative text, or other messages and patterns
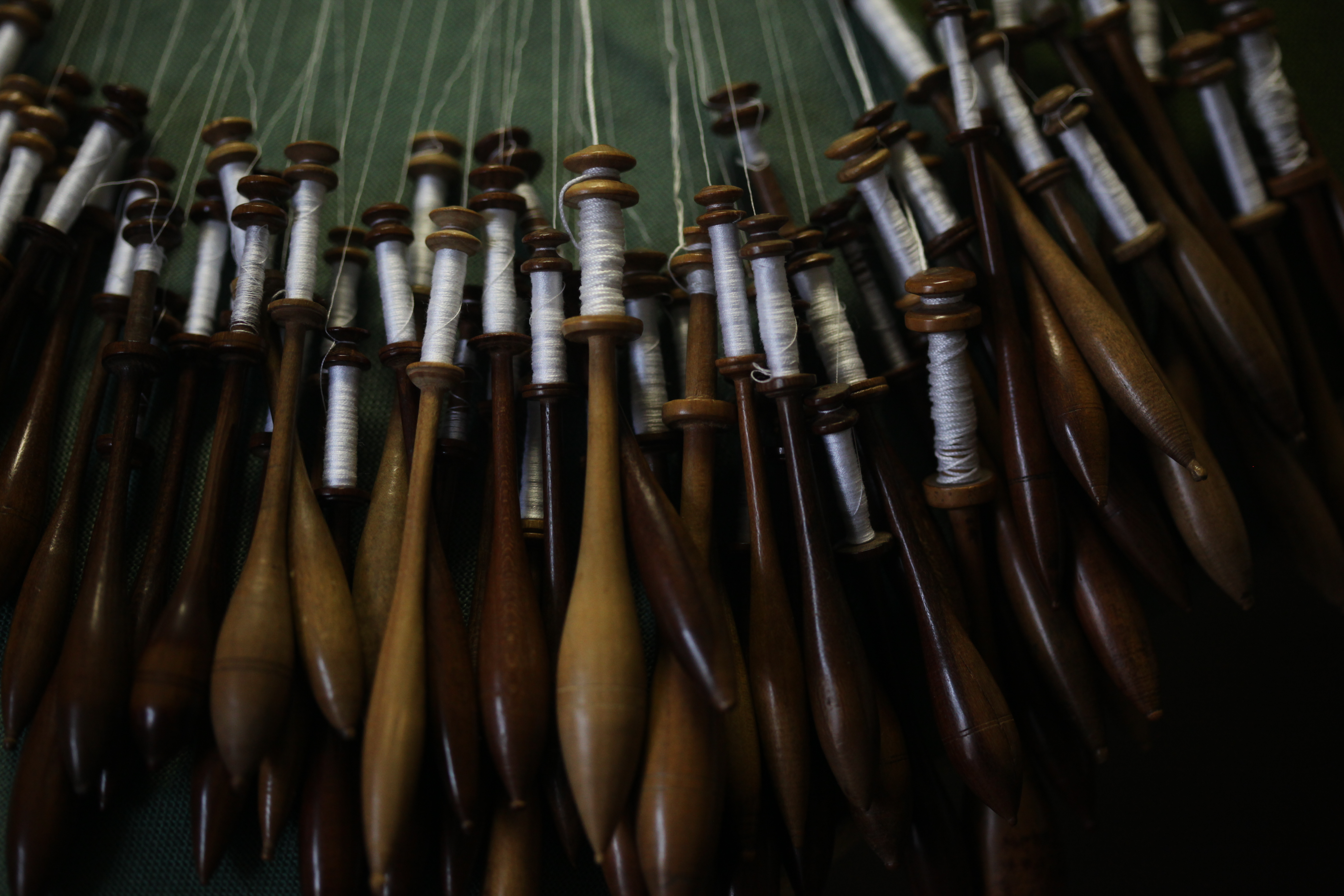
Cat tails, whose points are convenient for sewing

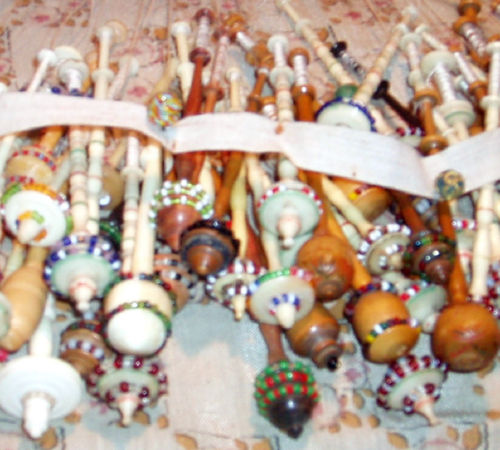
Danish bobbins

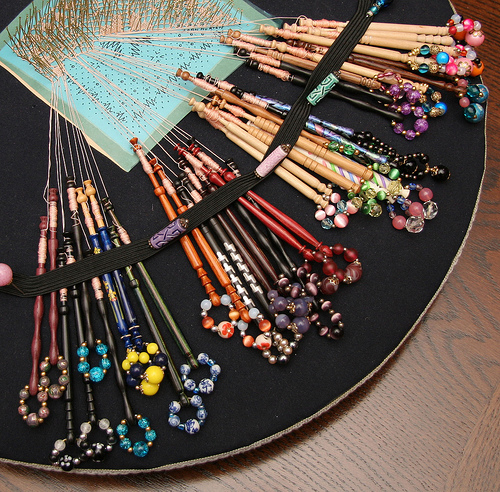
Spangled bobbins

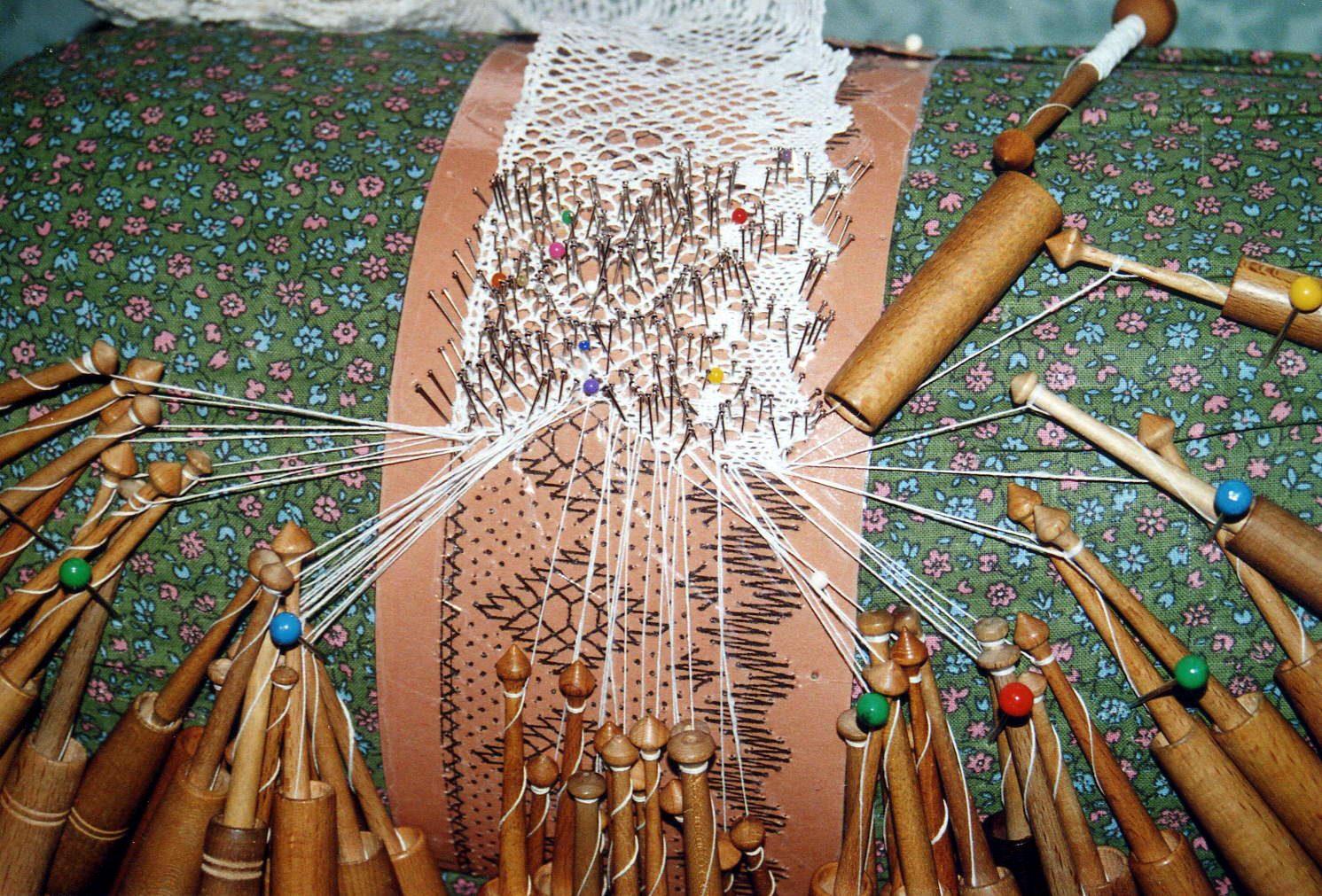
Hooded bobbins

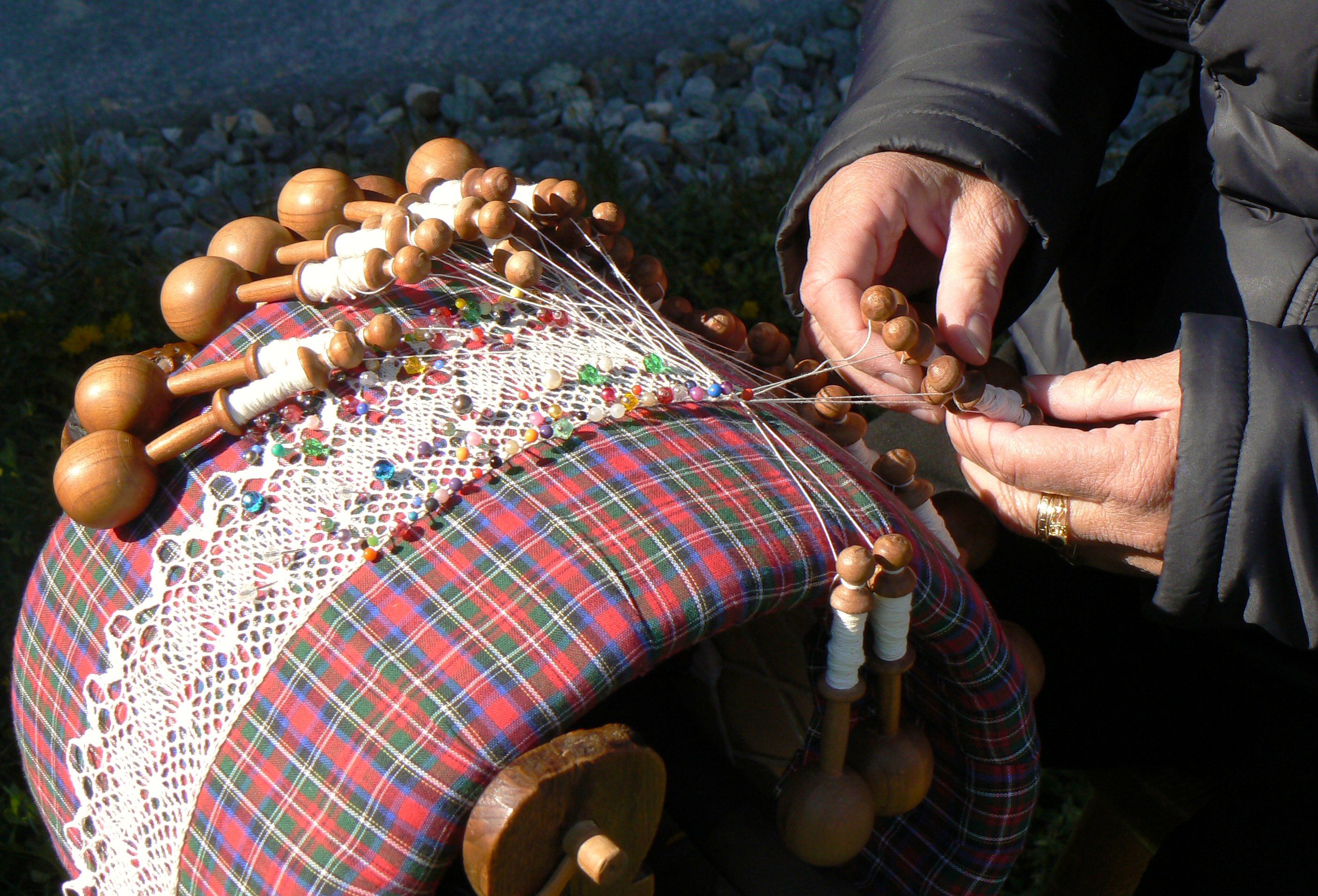
Large bulbs to throw every now and then, Cogne

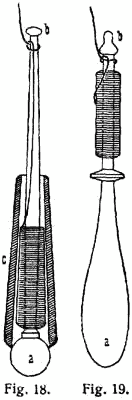
winding schemes with a single hitch

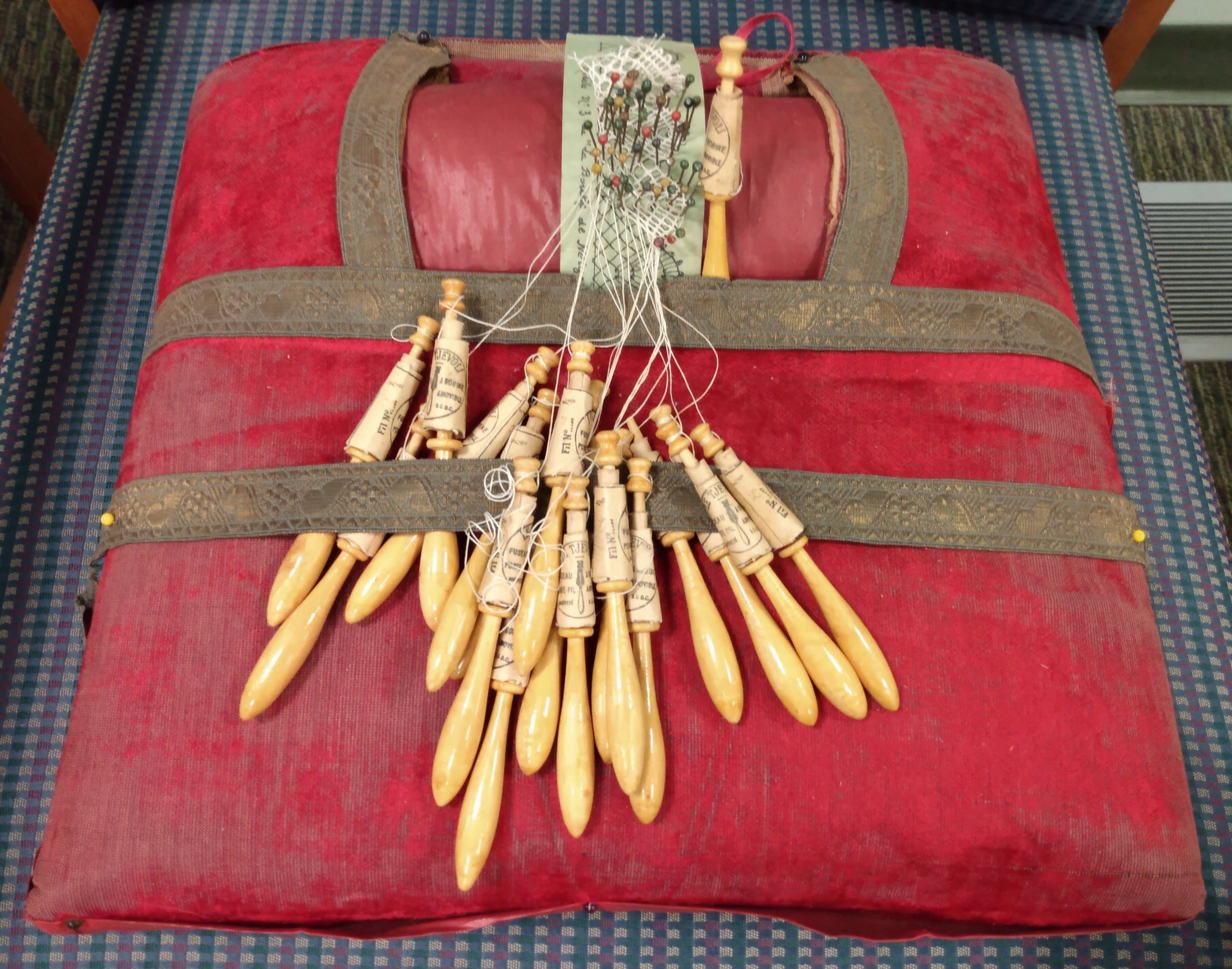
French Lace Pillow with bobbin cartridges

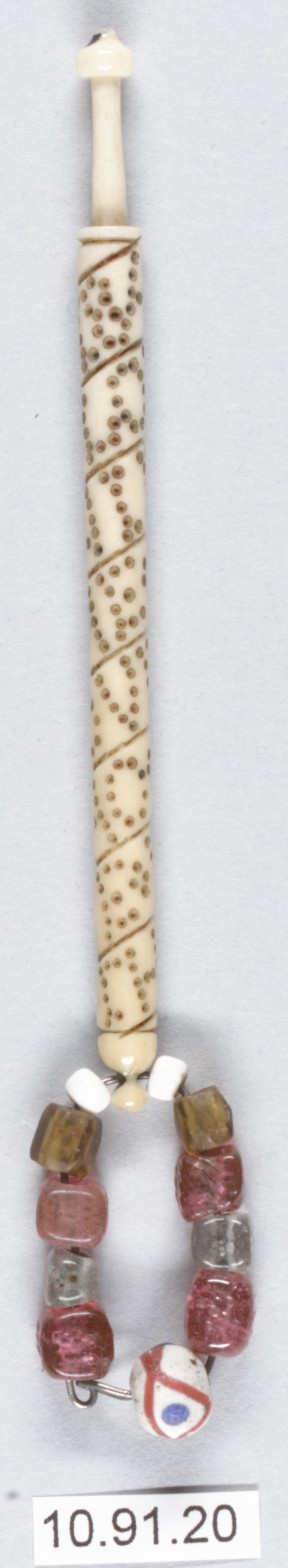
Bone Bobbin MET DP7530, inscribed with text

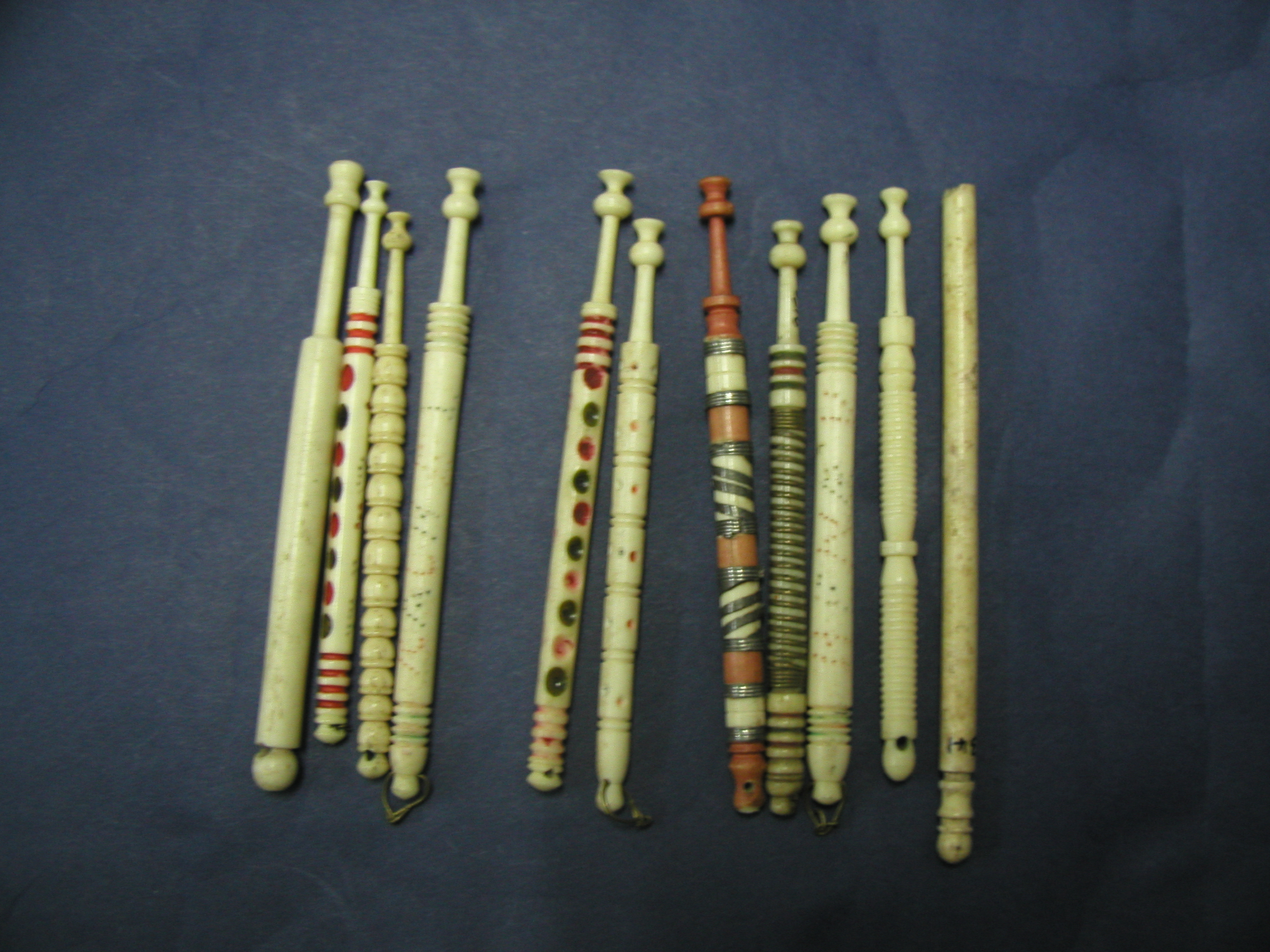
Bobbins (AM 9180), with various engraved decorations

=== Types of pillows ===
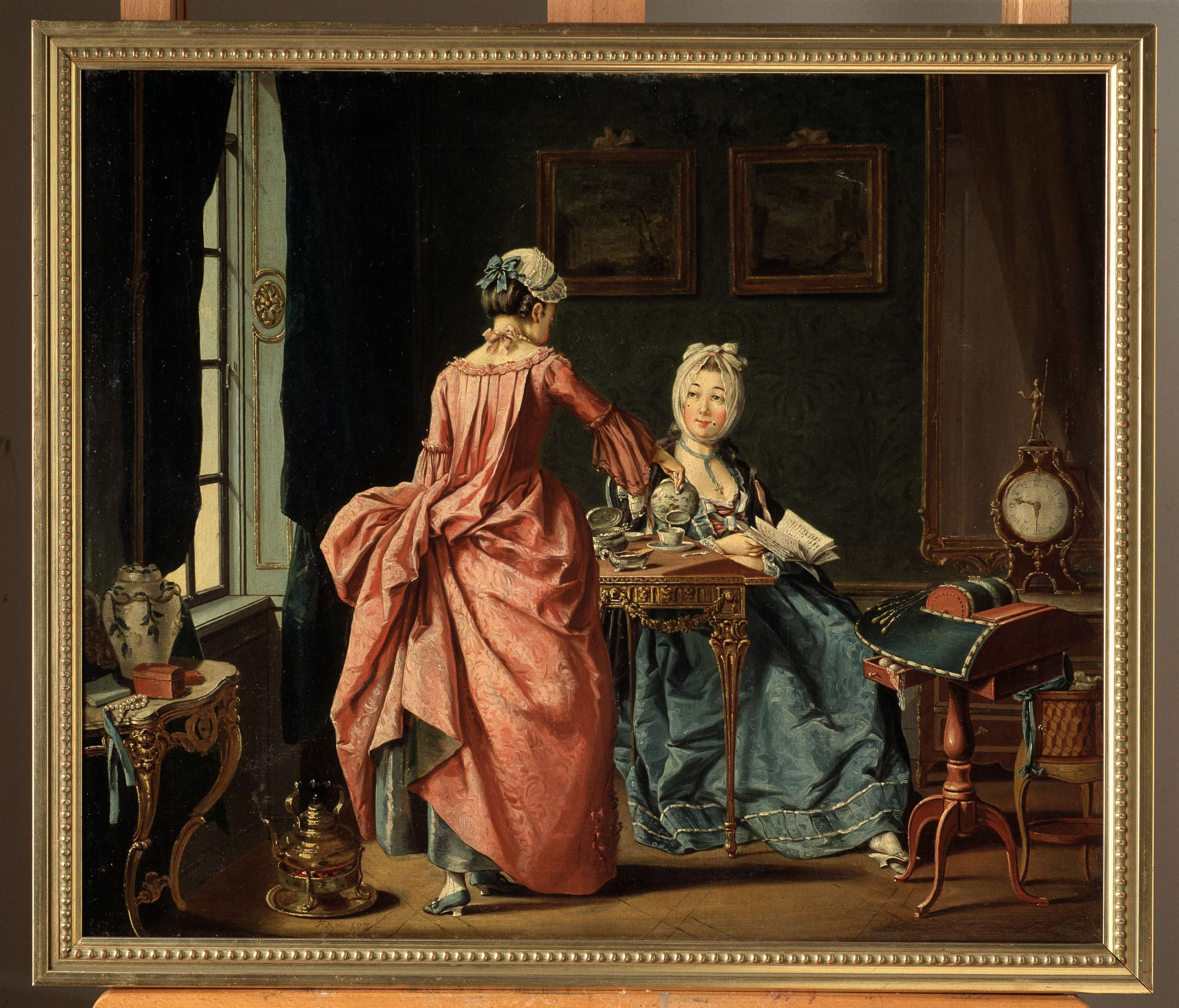
"A lady sits and reads, the chambermaid comes with tea" 1775 roller pillow

The pillows must be firm, or otherwise the pins will wobble. The pillows were traditionally stuffed with straw, but nowadays polystyrene (styrofoam) is generally used. Pillows were historically characteristic of the different regions where lace was made, but contemporary lacemakers may have multiples styles of pillows to accomplish different lace styles and projects.

An early type of pillow can be seen in The Lace Maker by Caspar Netscher. The pillow has a wooden frame, and is slightly sloping. The lace-maker rests it on her lap. Another representation of the similar style of pillow is found in the painting The Lacemaker by Johannes Vermeer. The Lace-Maker portrait by Gabriël Metsu was memorialized in a postage stamp.

The bolster or cylindrical pillow was much cheaper to make as it is just a fabric bag stuffed with straw. It was used in Bedfordshire lace. It needs a stand as it does not have a flat bottom. Usually the bolster had the pattern pinned round the cylinder, so by turning the pillow, the lace could be as long as was needed. However, Maltese lacemakers used the pillow the other way. They had a long thin pillow, which they rested against something. Then they worked the lace down the length of the pillow.

This problem (of the lace needing to be longer than the pillow) is solved in a different way by the roller pillow, which has a small roller, for working the lace, set into a larger area, where the bobbins are laid. This means that the pattern can be pinned round the roller, but the pillow has a flat bottom.

The cheapest modern pillow is domed and made of polystyrene (styrofoam). It is often called a cookie pillow, because of its shape. Another modern pillow is a block pillow, with a frame which holds covered polystyrene blocks. The blocks can be moved around as the lace progresses, to keep the lace being worked on at the centre of the pillow.

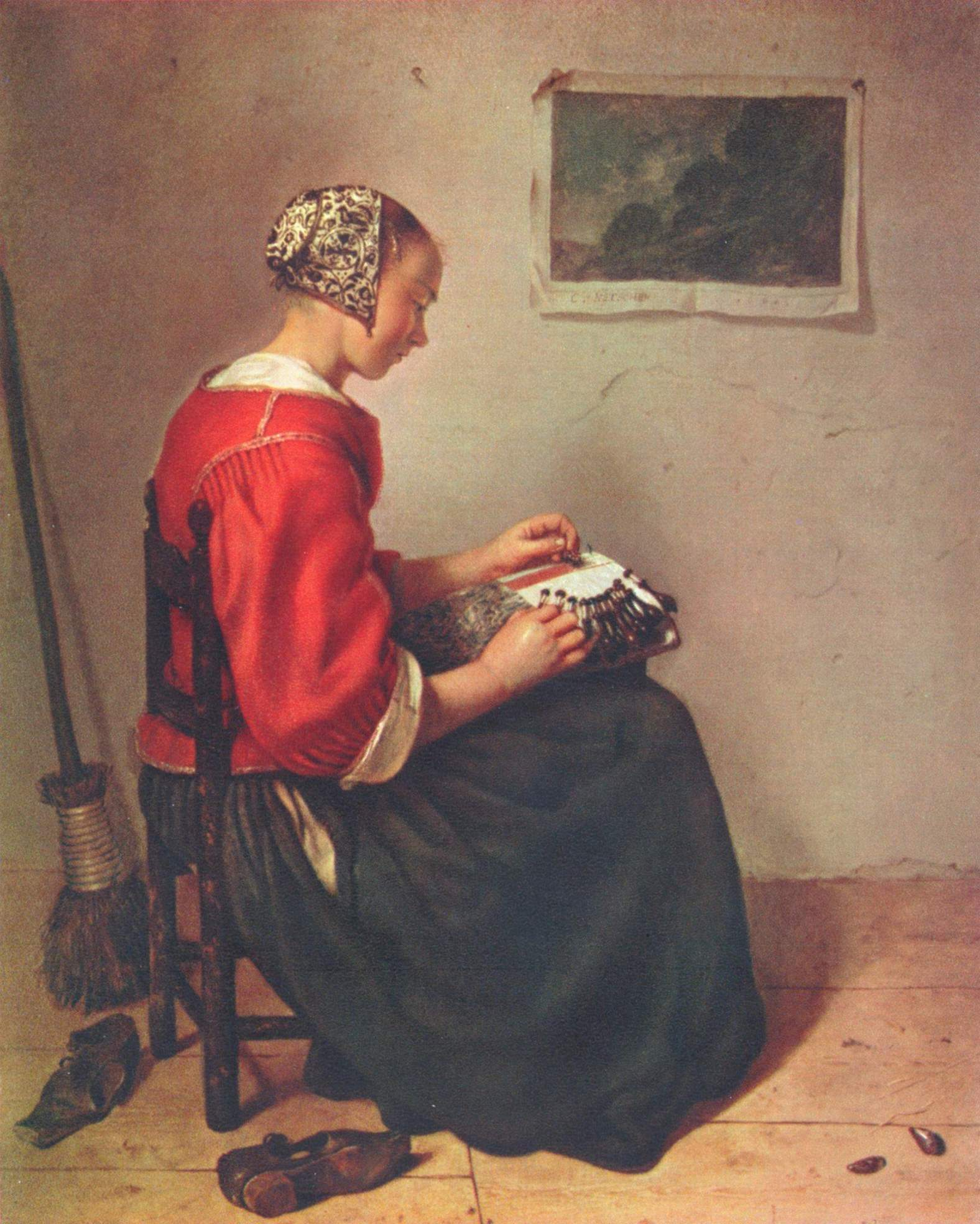
by Caspar Netscher an early pillow with a wooden frame

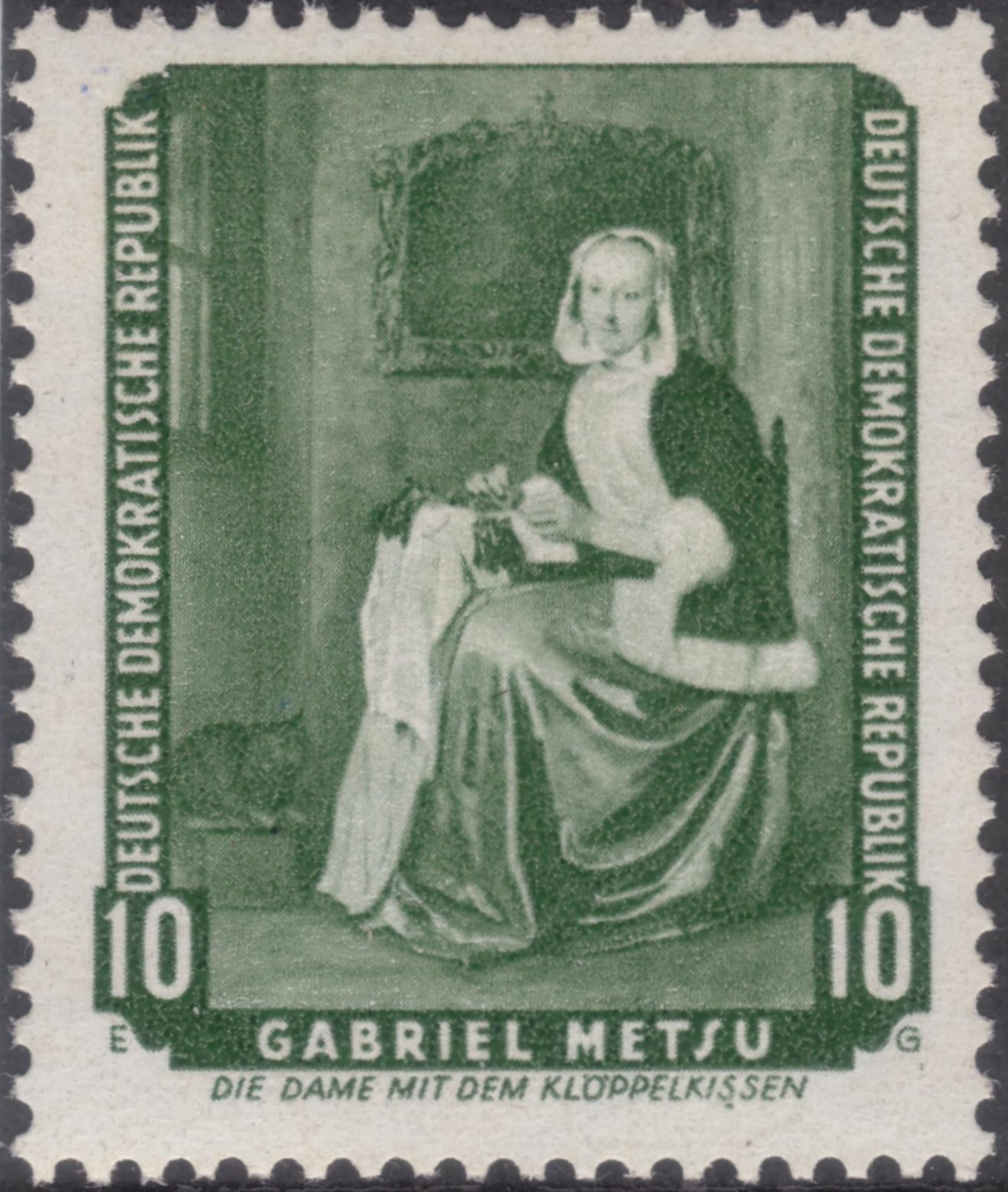
DDR 1959 Michel 694 Gabriël Metsu

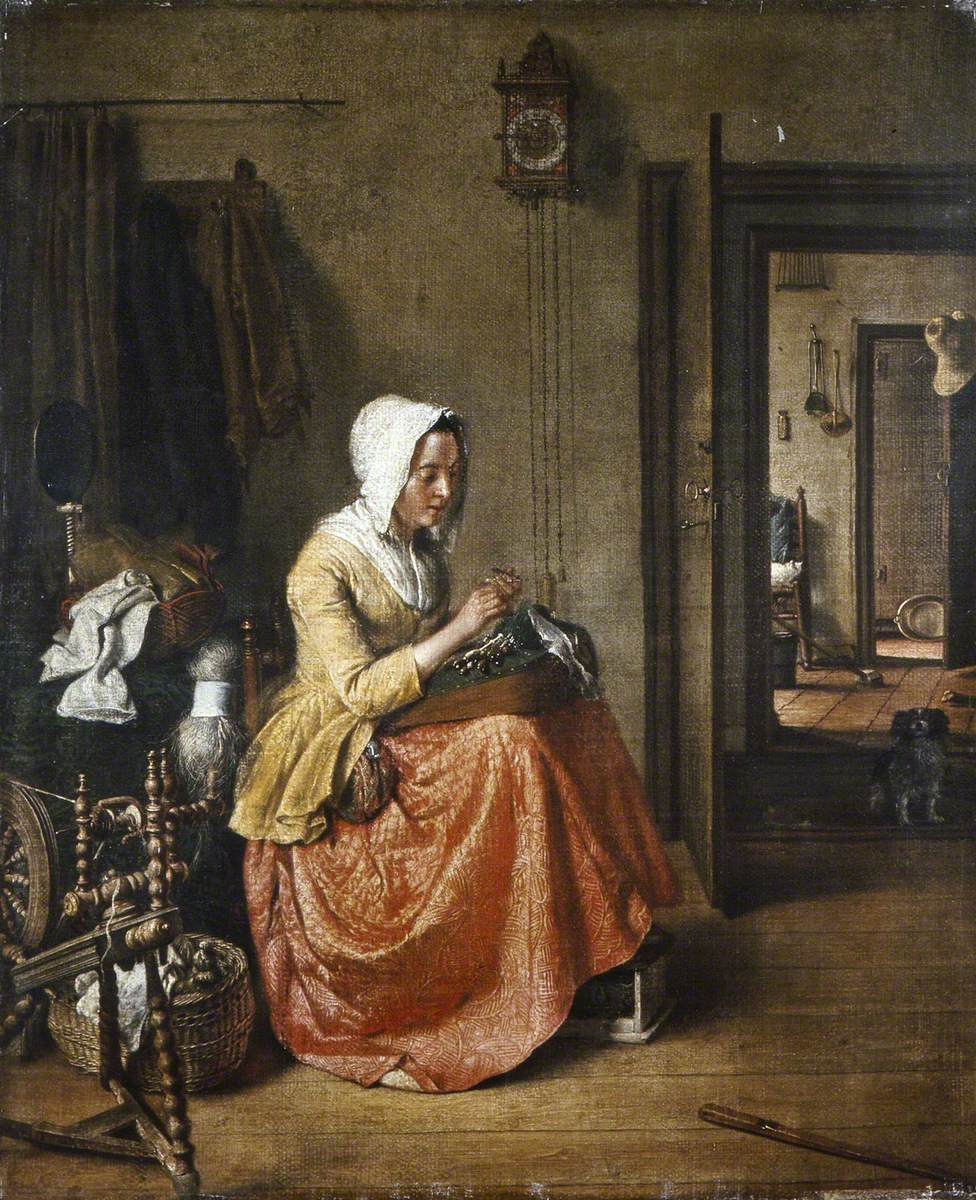
Wybrand Hendriks (1744-1831) - The Lace Maker - Brighton Museum Art Gallery

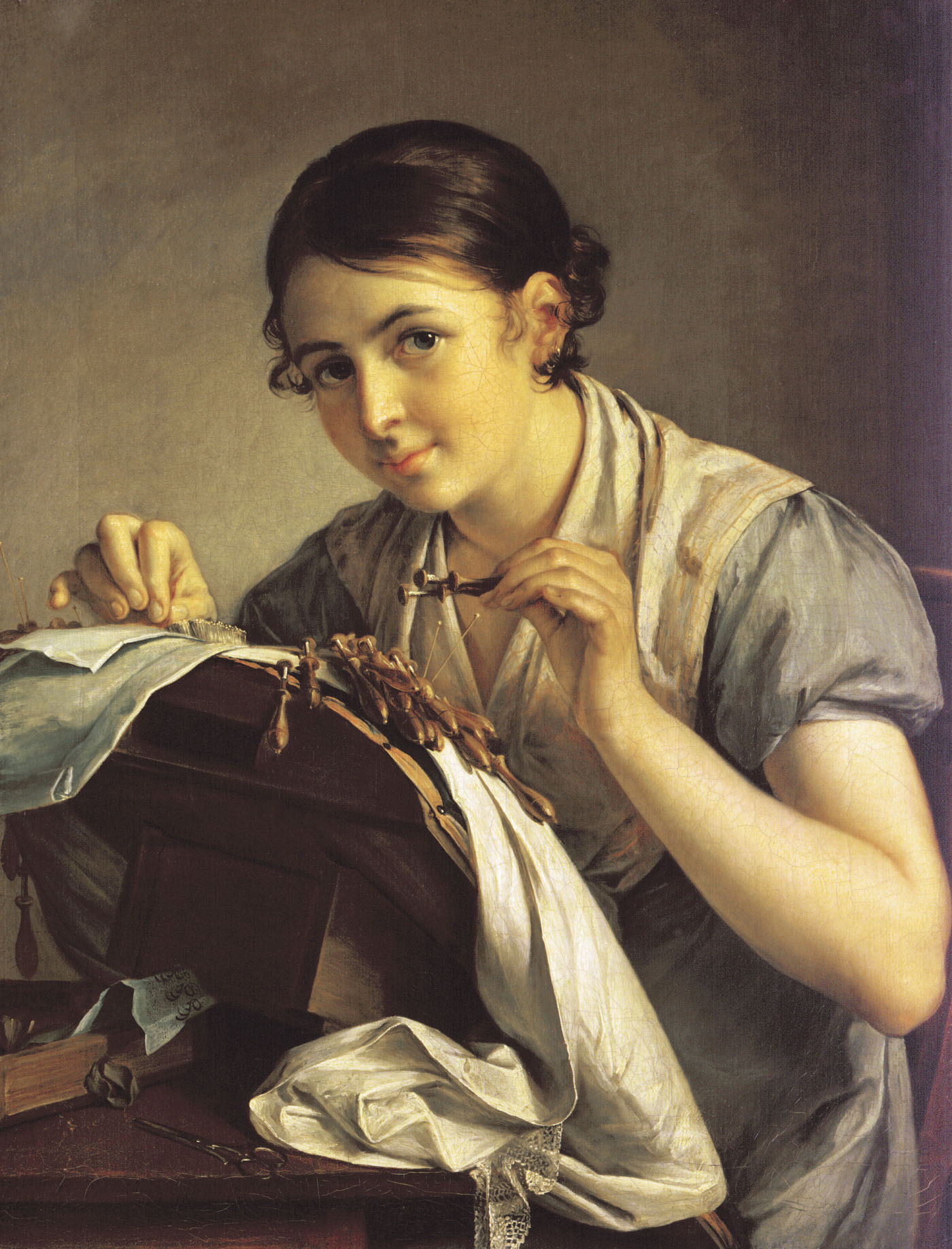
by Vasily Tropinin

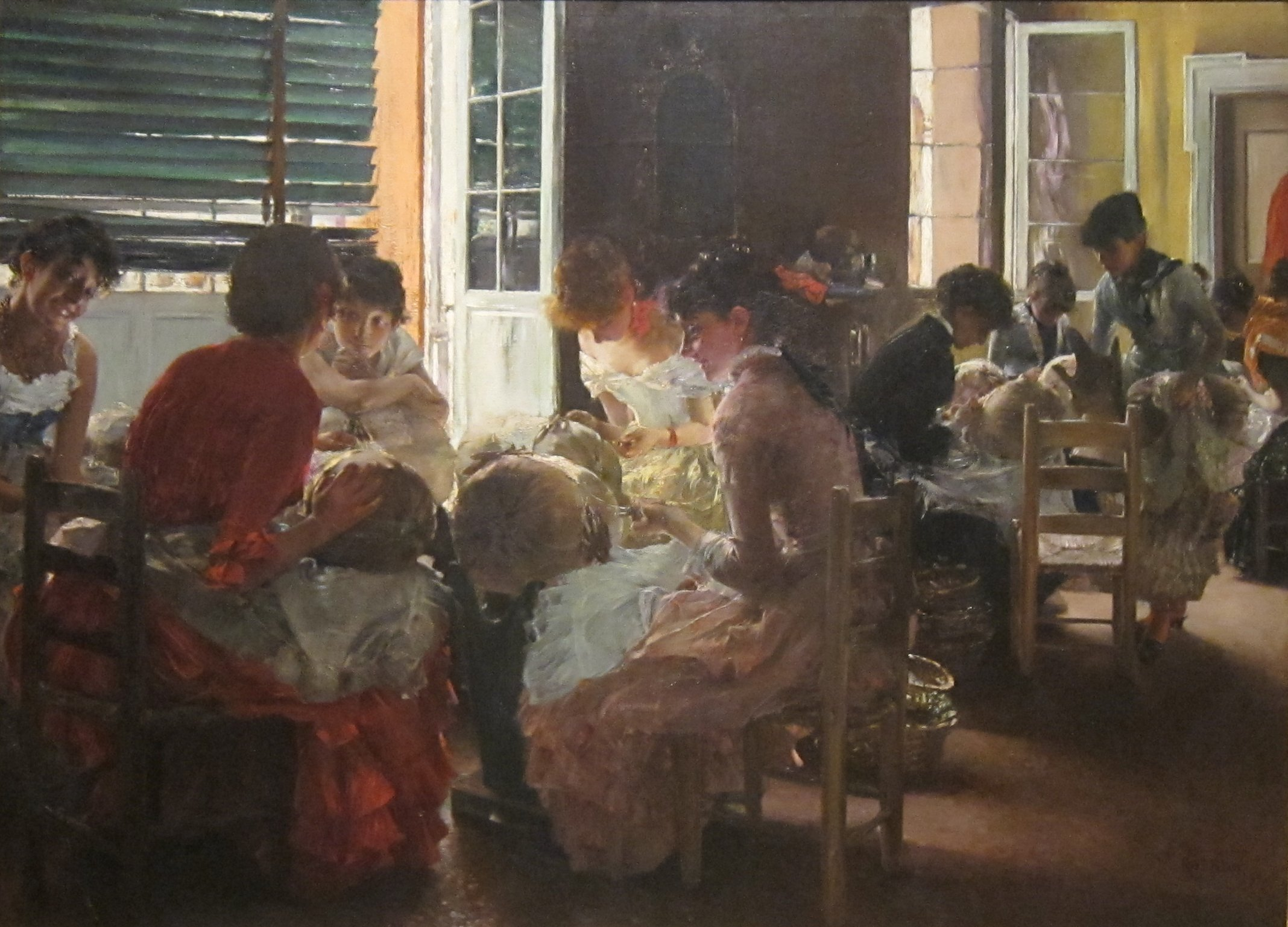
by Robert Frederick Blum bolster pillows

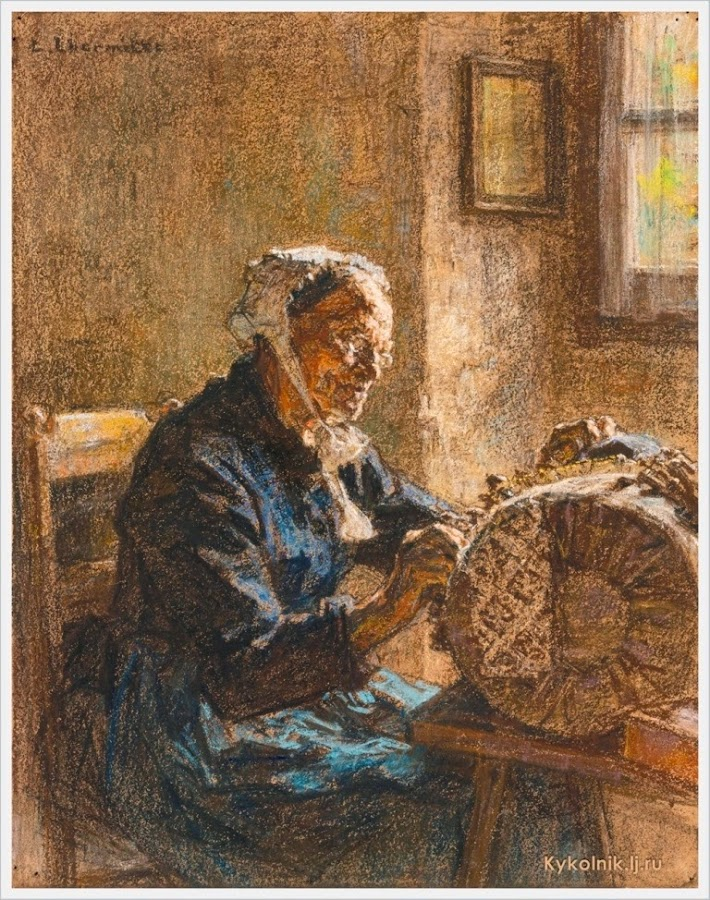
by Léon Augustin Lhermitte a pillow typical for Queyras

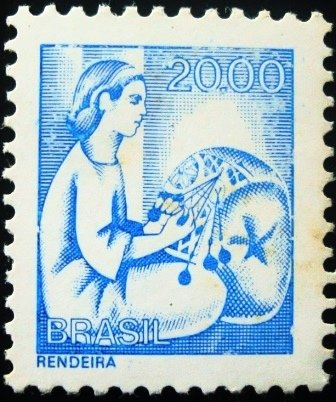
Stamp of Brazil - 1976 - Lacemaker and bolster pillow

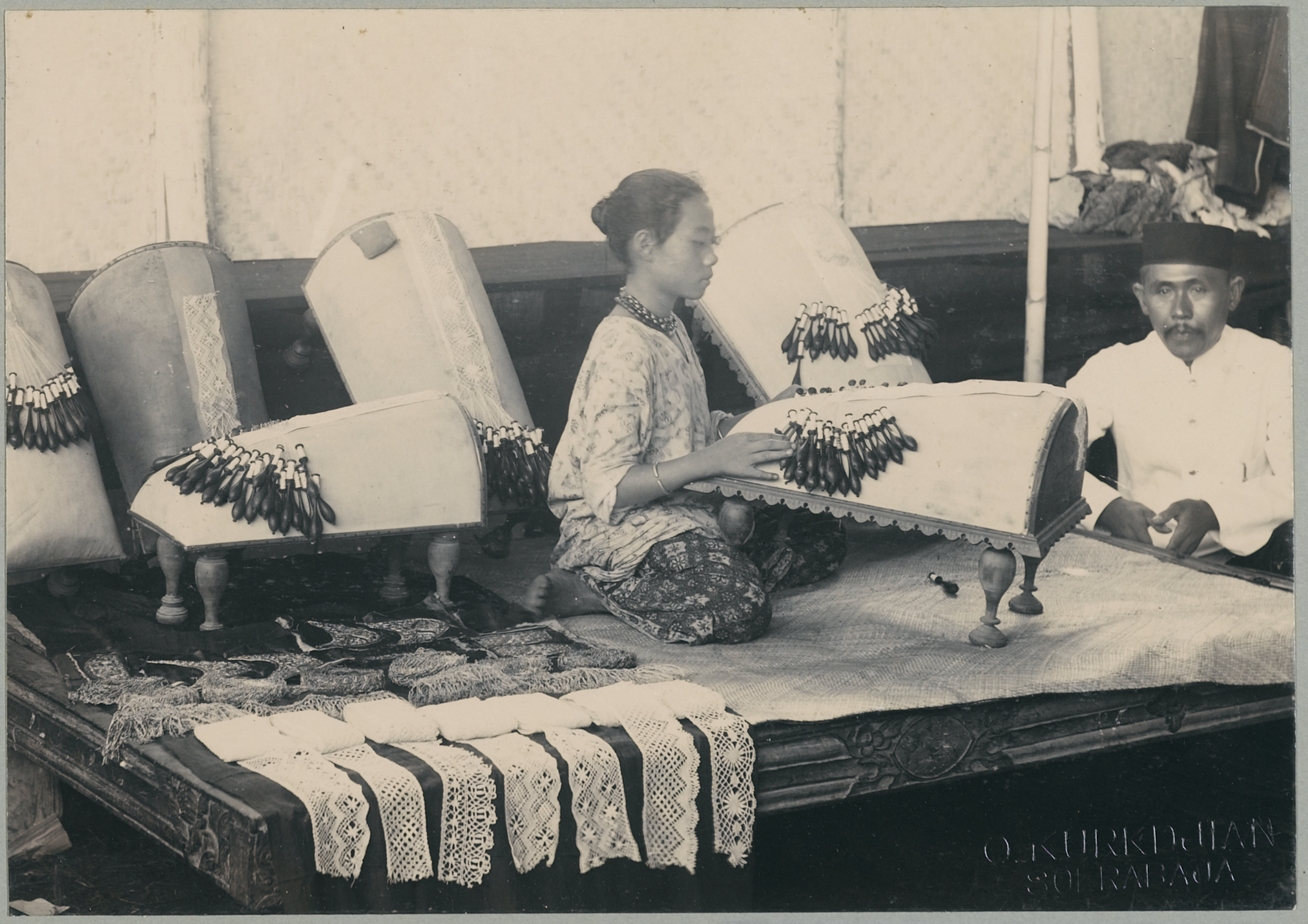
Woman lace-maker from Sumatra

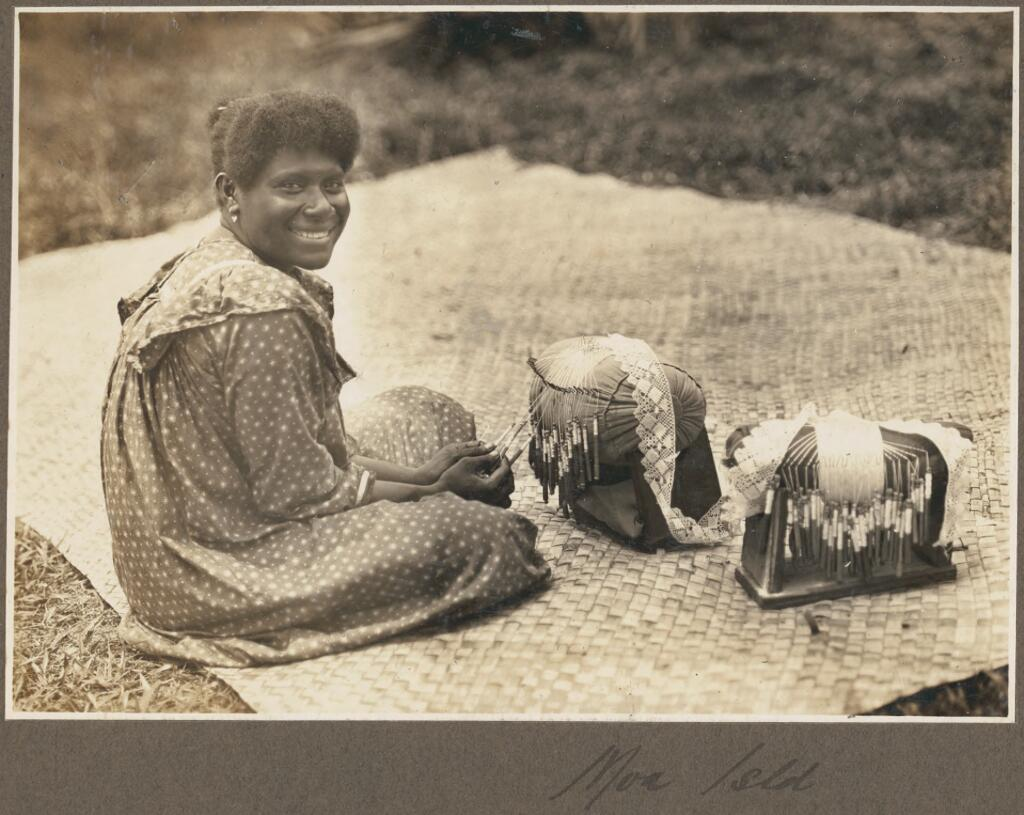
Moa Island (woman sitting on mat making lace)

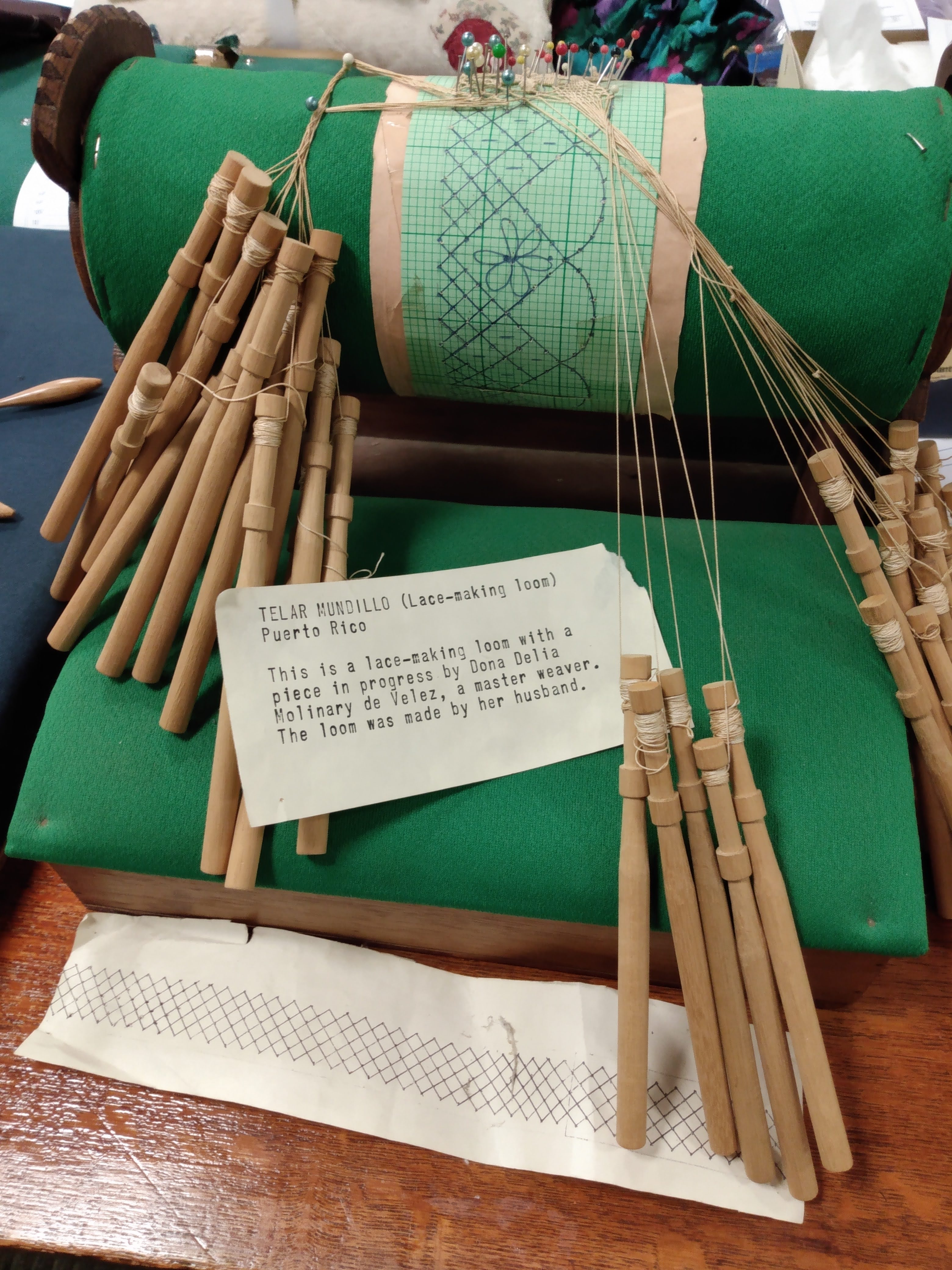
Mundillo bobbin lace roller pillow and bobbins with pricking, from Puerto Rico

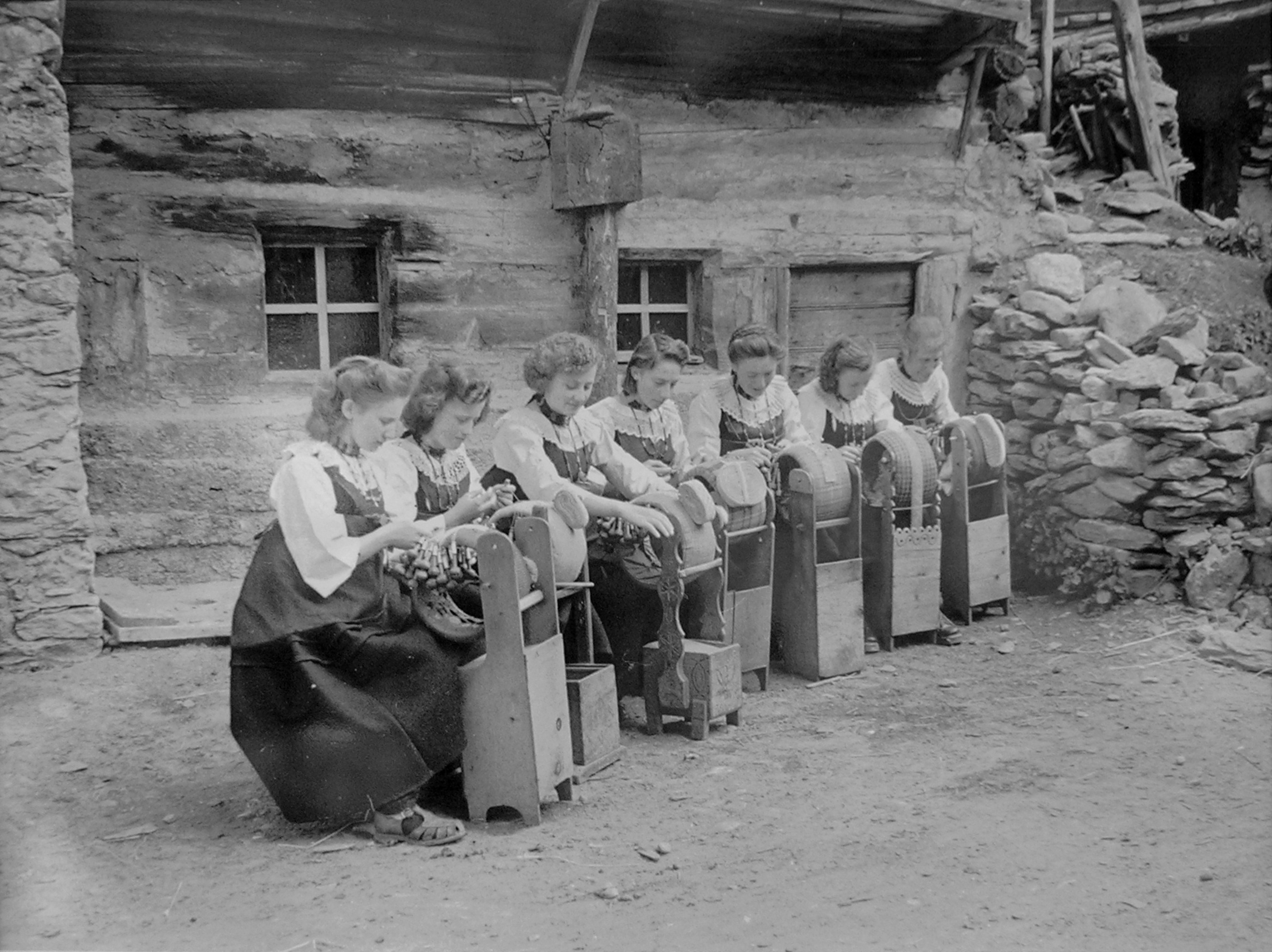
Cogne pillows and stands

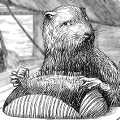
Victorian domed pillow in The Hunting of the Snark

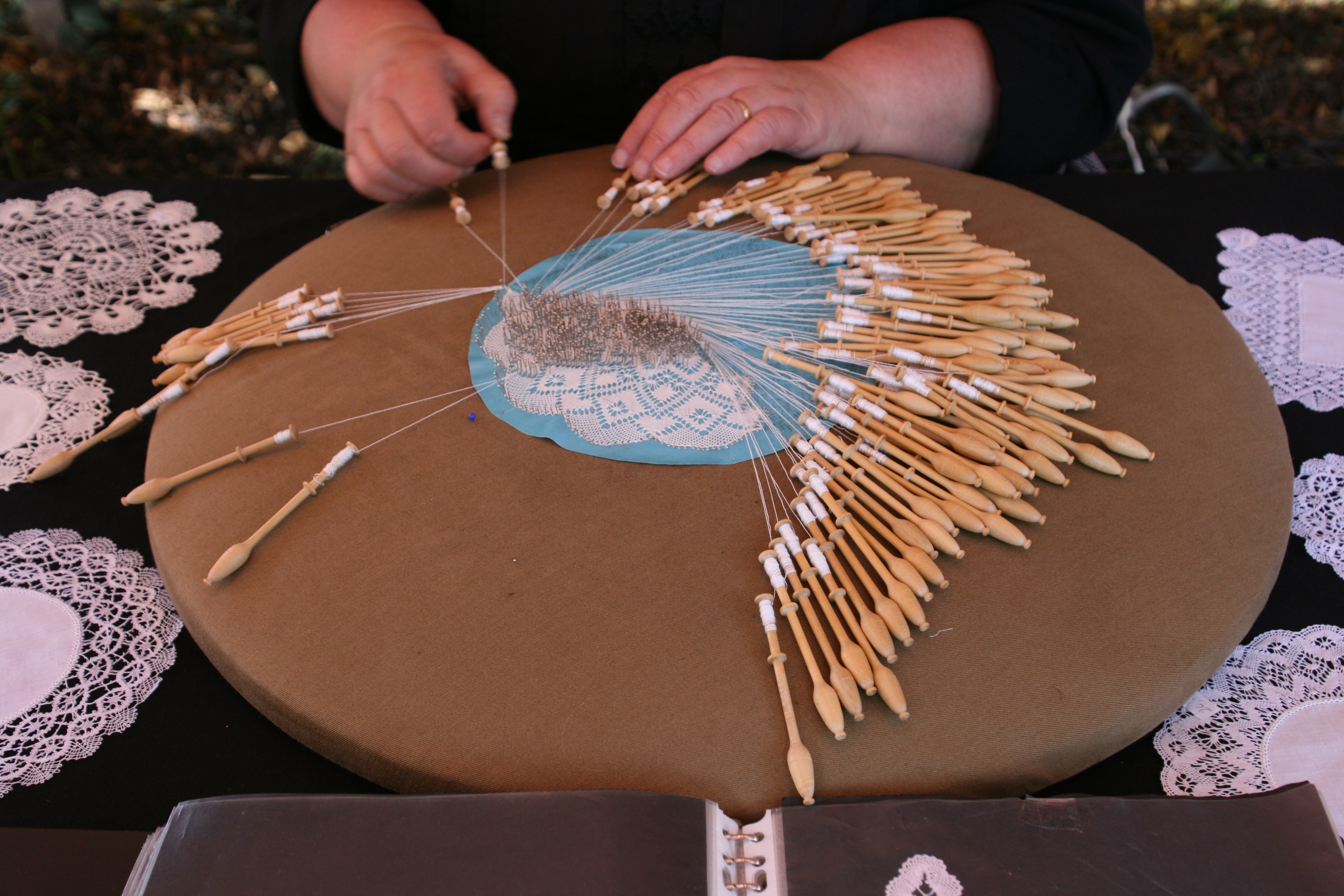
Modern domed pillow or "cookie pillow"

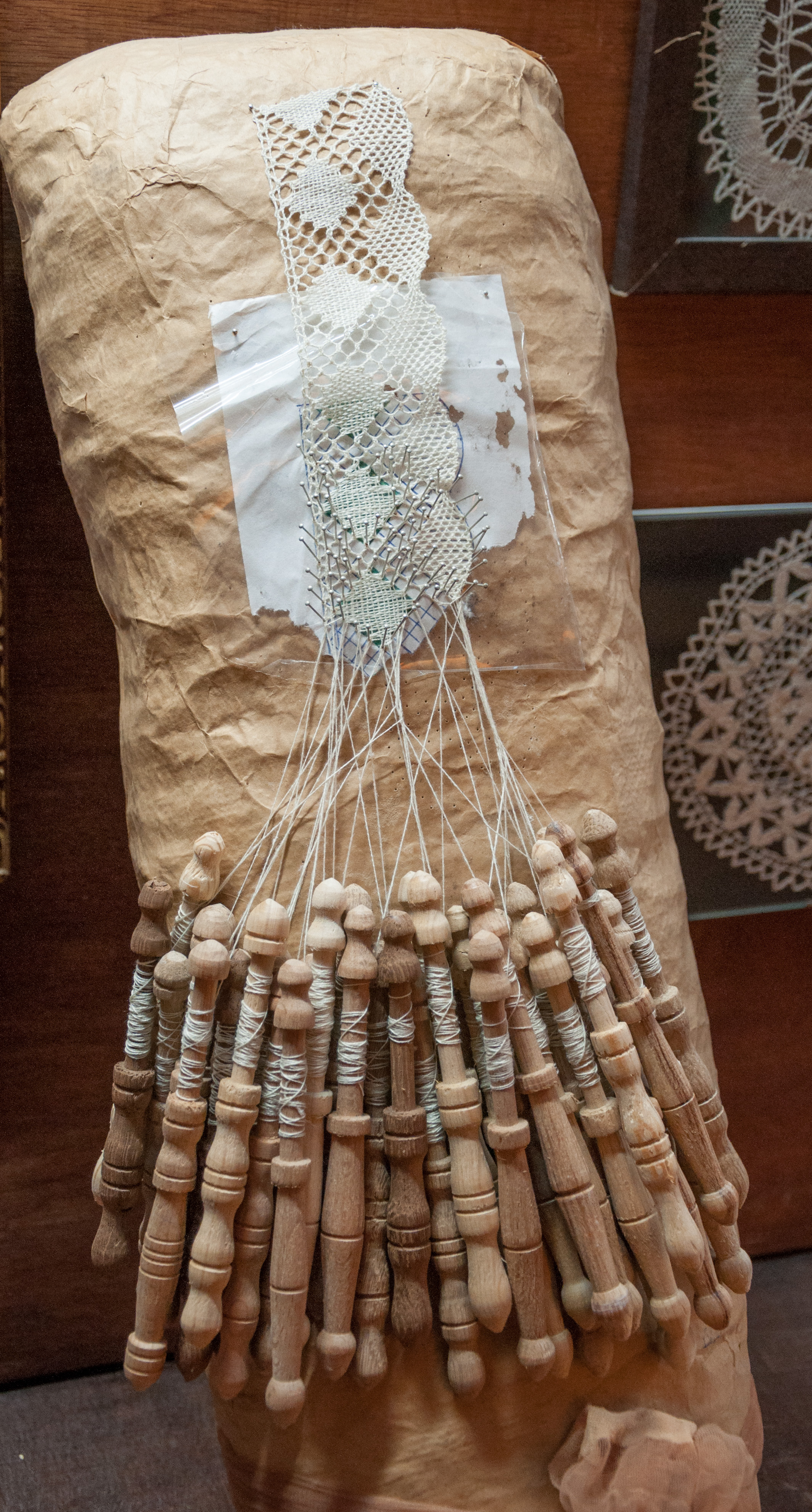
Maltese bolster

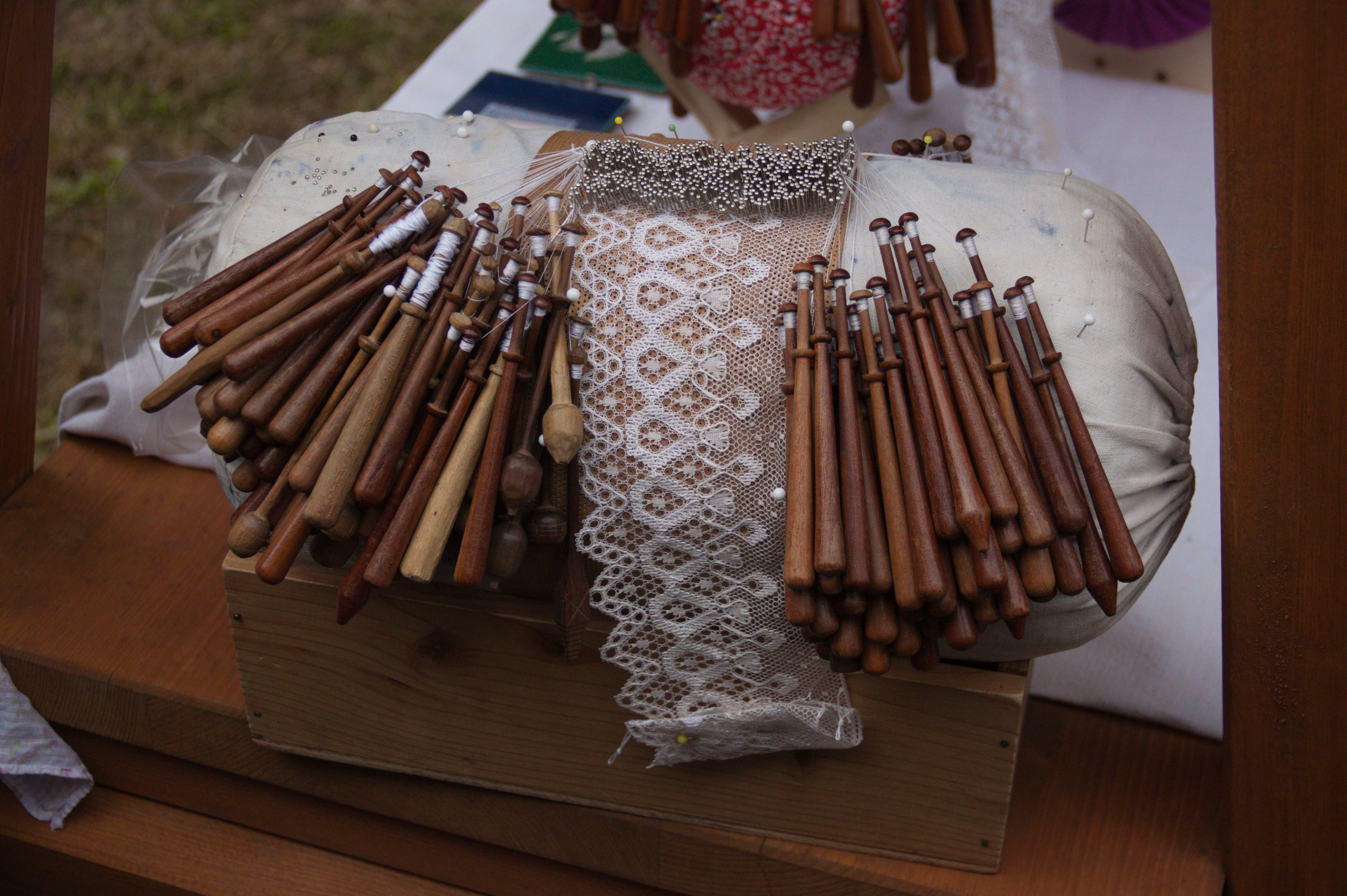

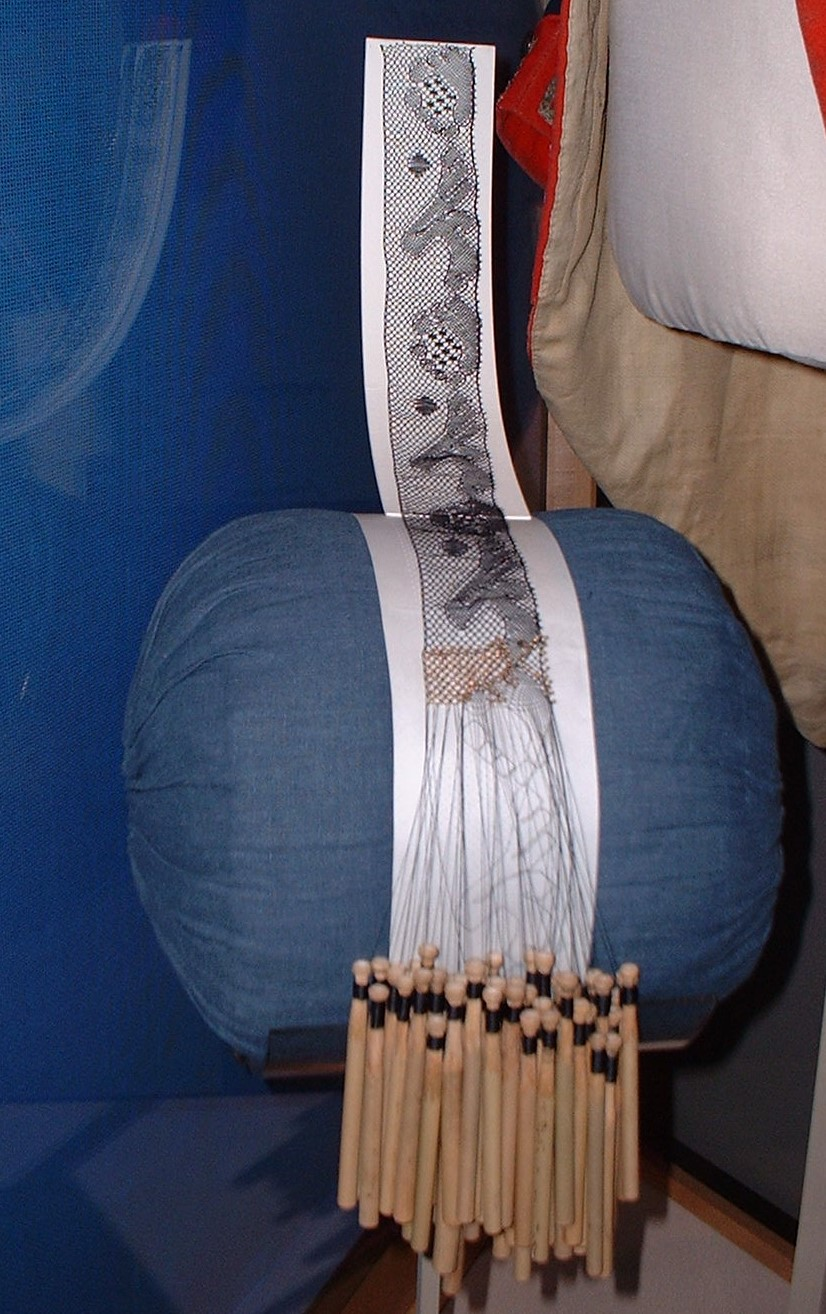
Ipswich bolster

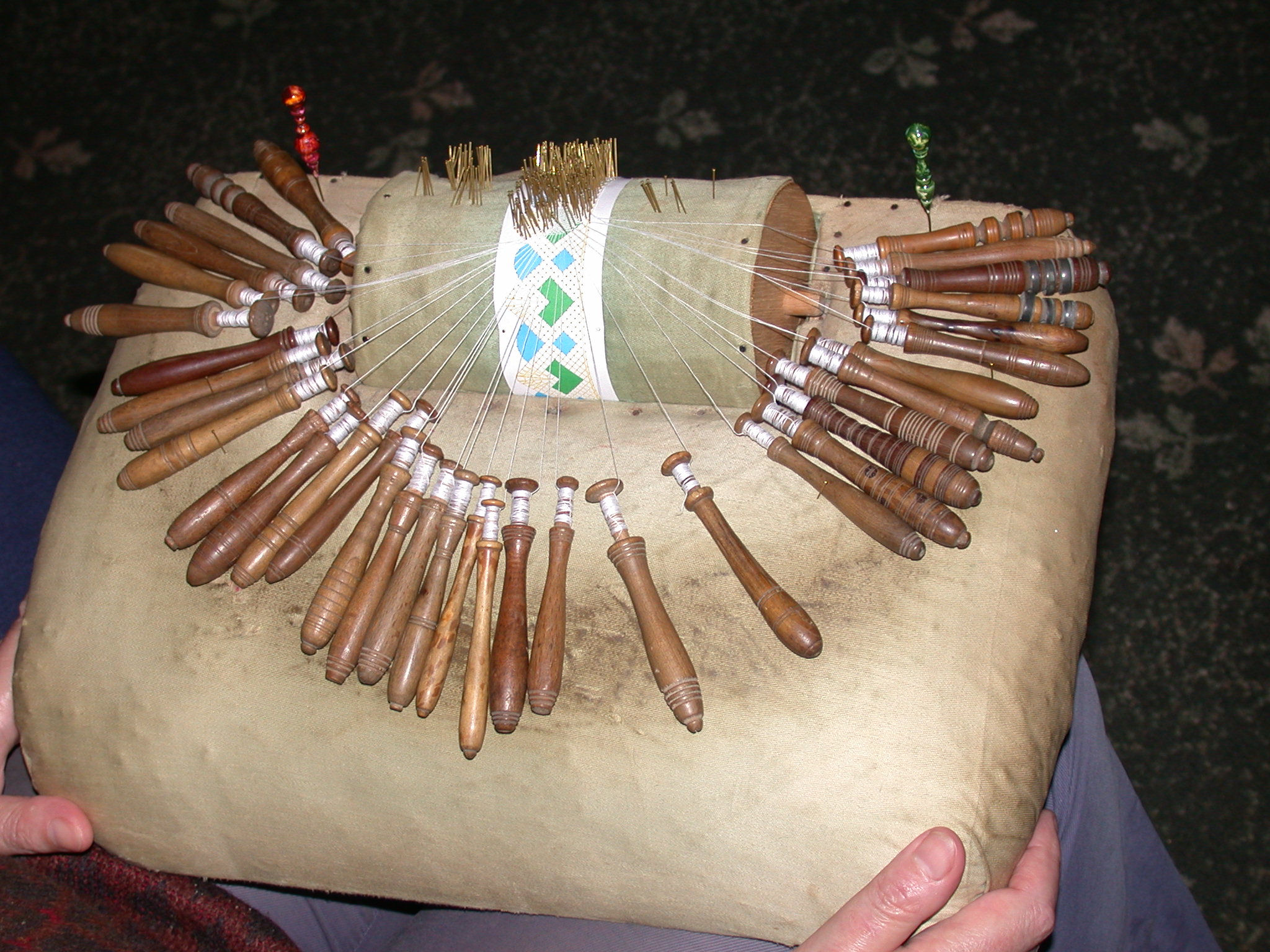
Roller pillow

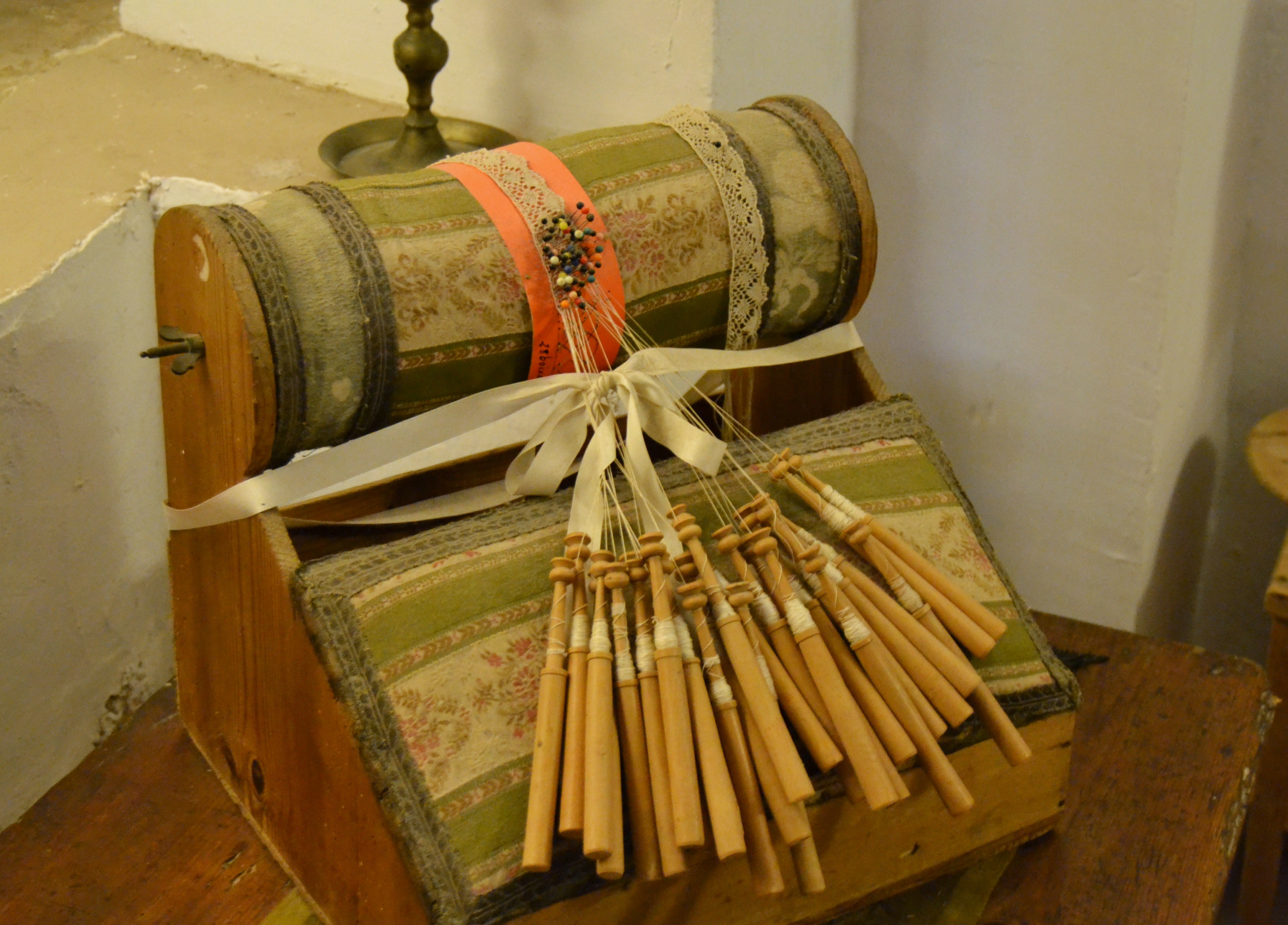
Roller pillow

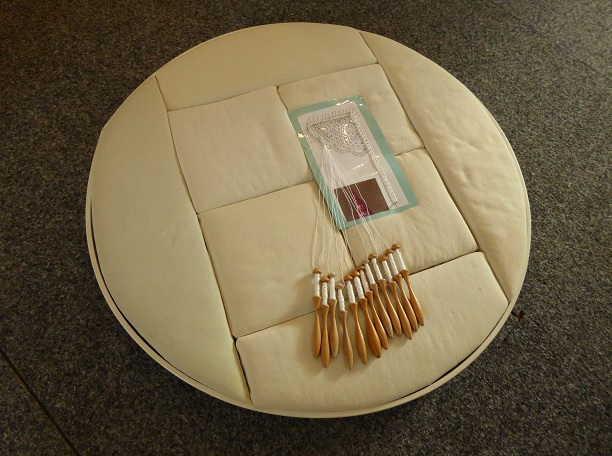
Block pillow

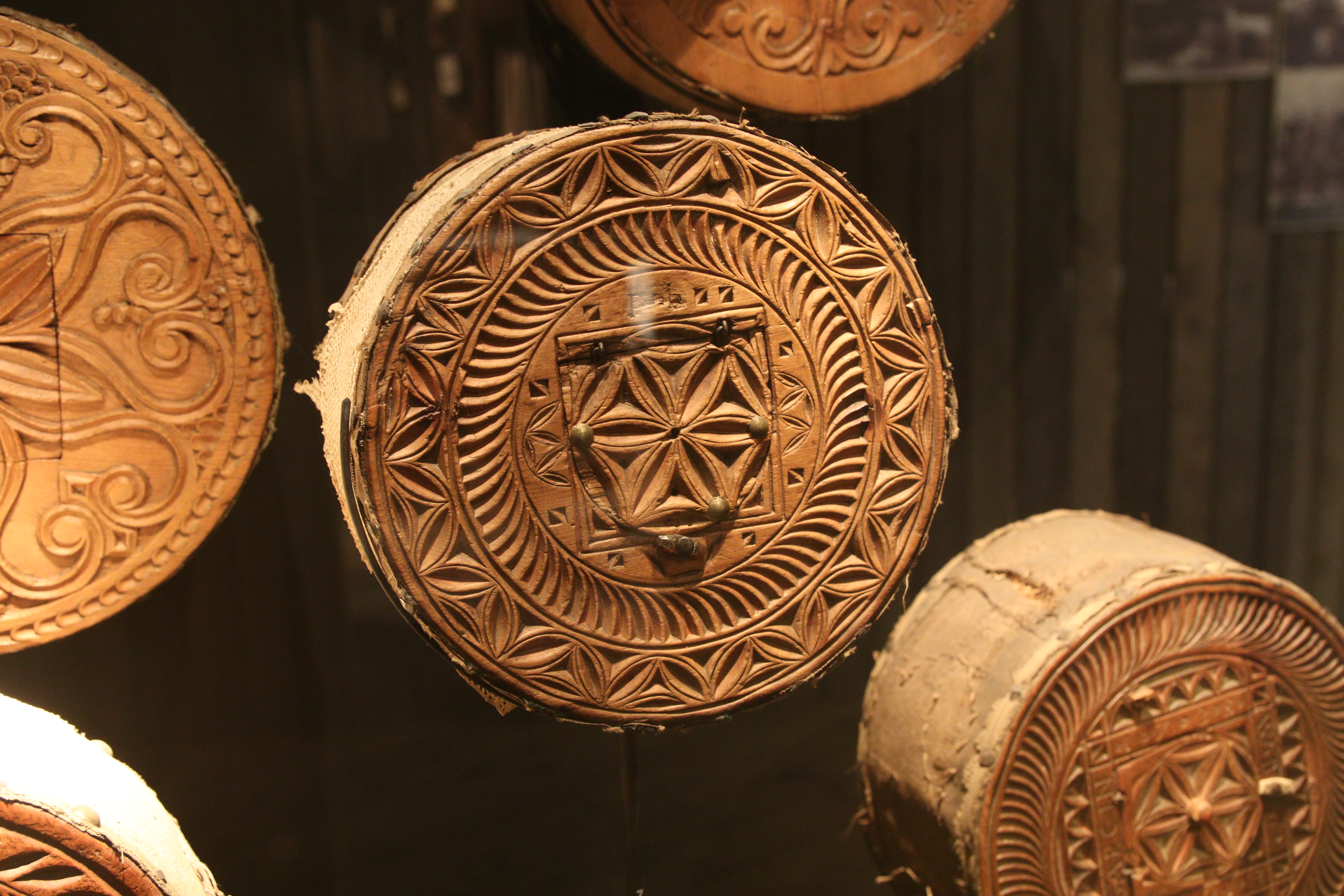
Type of lace loom in use in the Dauphinoise Alps

=== Thread ===
Bobbin lace may be made with coarse or fine threads. Traditionally it was made with linen, silk, wool, or, later, cotton threads, or with precious metals. Bess of Hardwick bought red silk, gold, and silver thread for making "bone lace" in 1549, the earliest English reference to this kind of work. Today bobbin lace is made with a variety of natural and synthetic fibers and with wire and other filaments. Even bobbin lace made from human hair, point tresse, was once popular as a personal memento.

== Lacemaking organizations ==
Lacemaking is considered a folk art with technique and materials varying widely across the globe. Most lacemakers belong to regional guilds within their country of origin. Guilds can be devoted to one kind of lace, often that which developed locally, or may include makers of all kinds. In the United States, most guilds are organized within chapters of the International Organization of Lace, which also includes Canadian lace guilds. Quarterly publications of "The Bulletin" journal provide articles about current projects and events, historical research, annual meeting details, patterns, and more. Internationally, the Organisation Internationale de la Dentelle au Fuseau et à l'Aiguille (OIDFA, International Bobbin and Needle Lace Organization) is the primary governing and networking body for lacemakers. OIDFA organizes annual global congresses, regional fairs, and local gatherings to promote the appreciation and knowledge of lacemaking.
