= Flanders lace =

Type of bobbin lace from Flanders, Belgium

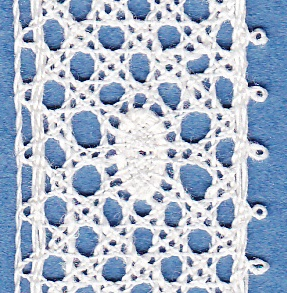
- Closeup of an exercise with five-hole ground
- Type: Lace
- Production method: Bobbin lace
- Production process: Craft production
- Place of origin: Flanders, Belgium

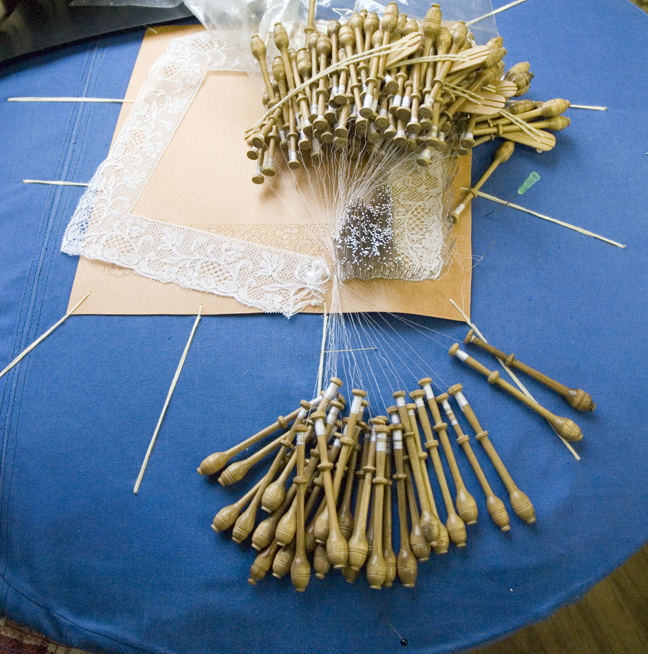
Flanders edging made at Kantcentrum in Bruges, Belgium.

Flanders lace (point de Flandres) was made in Flanders, which was particularly well known for its bobbin lace. The supreme epoch of Flemish lace lasted from about 1550-1750.

The lacemaking areas of Antwerp, Mechlin, Binche and Valenciennes are regarded as Flemish. They made mesh ground continuous lace. Brussels made part lace which is non-continuous.

== The ground ==
Old Flanders lace began by making Torchon lace, then used early five-hole ground. Today, the term Flanders lace is more usually applied to a late 19th century revival of the five-hole grounded lace.

Classical variations have pairs crossing at the tips of the rectangles, a modern variation crosses just threads what creates a more rectangular impression. Modern variations also use less pins at the headside and footside. Both changes make the modern interpretation slightly quicker to create but also more vulnerable, but modern lacemakers tend to frame their work rather than apply it on clothing. The similar rose ground in Torchon lace uses four pins at the edges of the rectangles, Flanders uses just one pin in the centre. Names for the ground:

- five-hole ground
- cinq trou
- virgin ground
- fond à la vierge
- rose stitch or rose ground.
