= Paris lace =

Bobbin lace using point de Paris ground

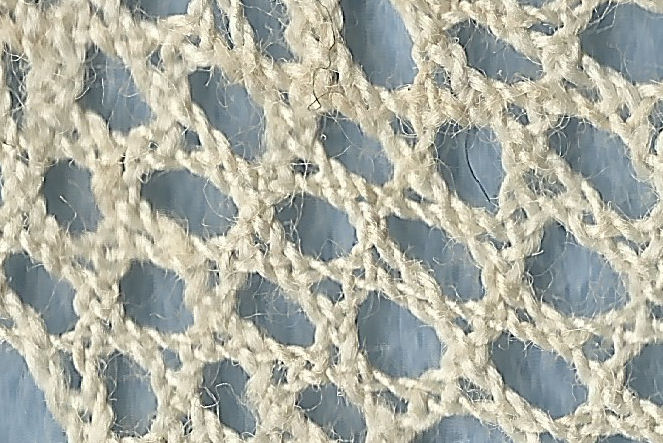
- Point de Paris ground in Flemish lace
- Type: Lace
- Production method: Bobbin lace
- Production process: Craft production
- Place of origin: Paris, France
- Introduced: 18th century

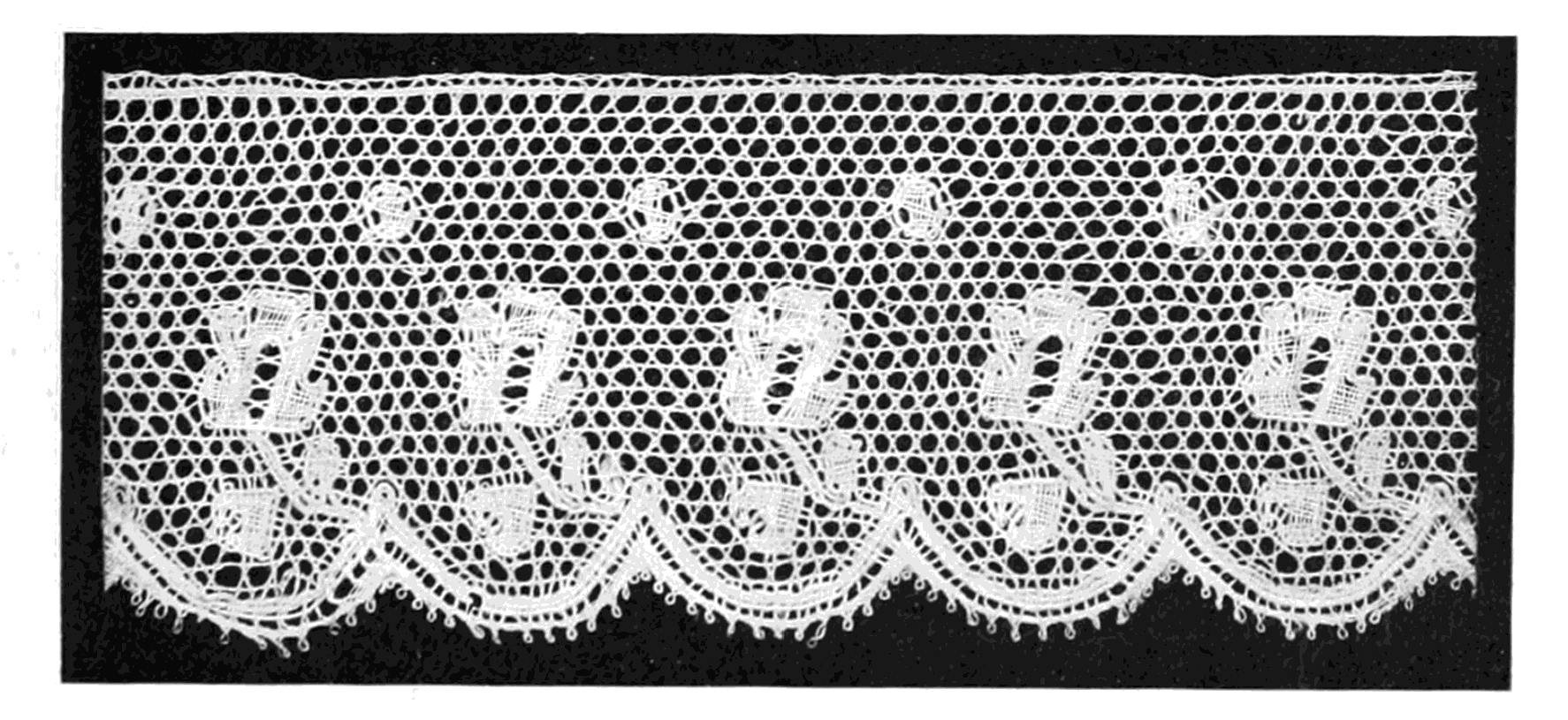
Example of Point de Paris lace from a 1904 text

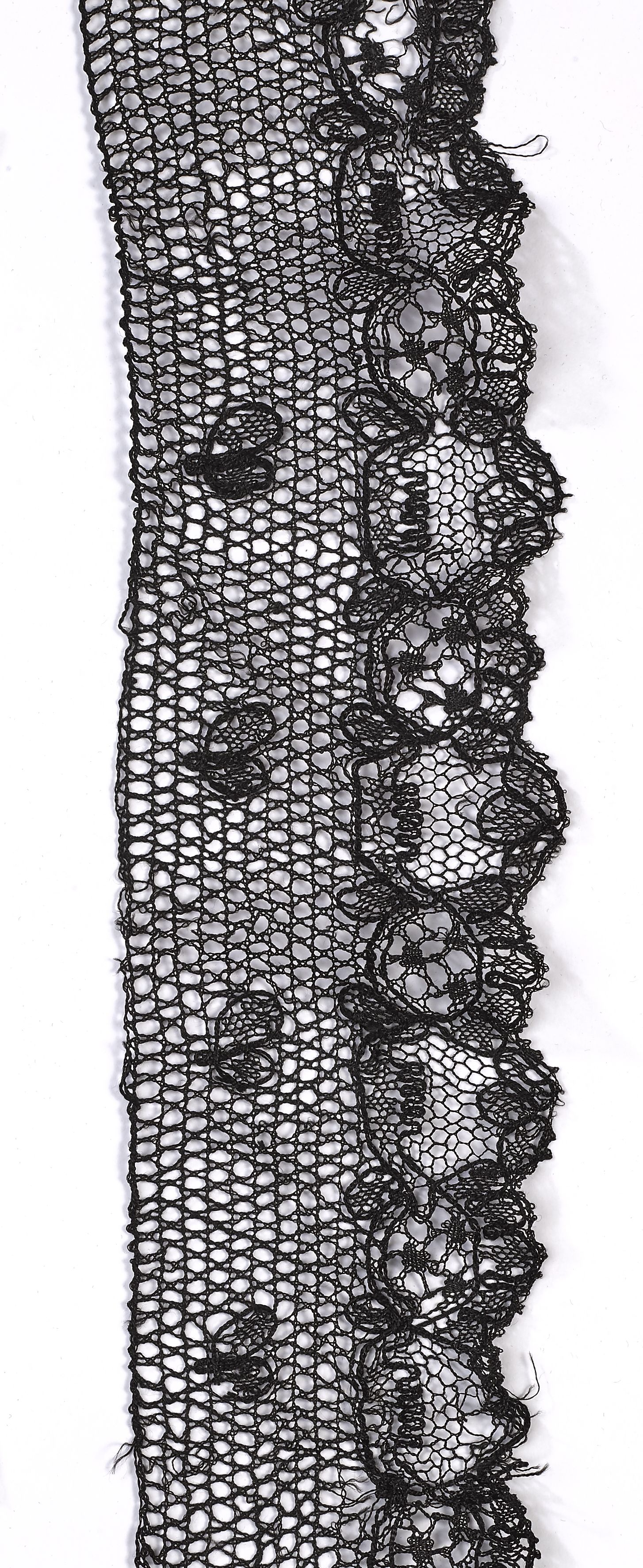
Black silk sample from the Fashion Museum of Antwerp

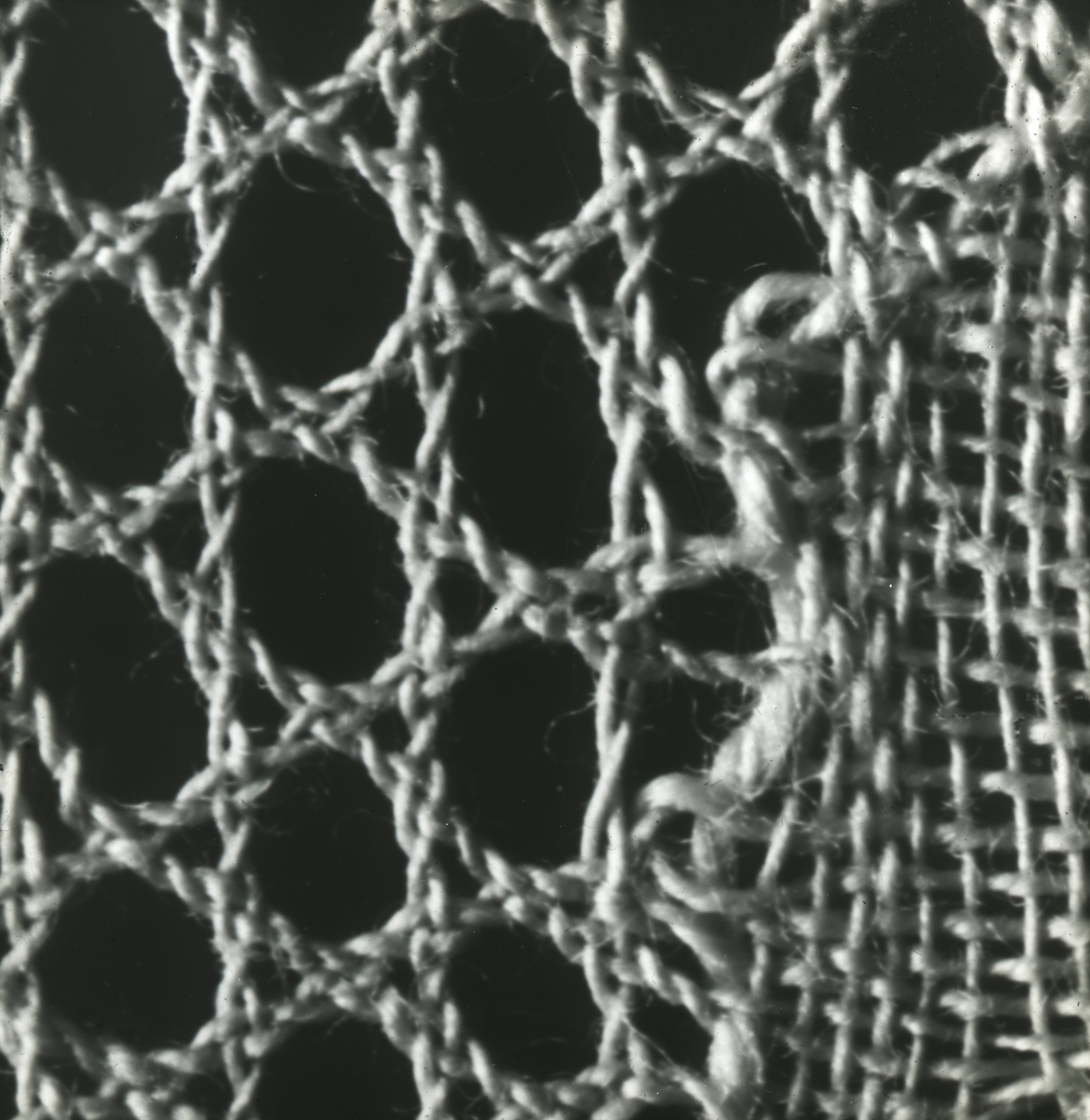
Detail Paris lace, 18th century

Point de Paris is a French bobbin lace of the 18th century, with slender trailing designs in a point de Paris ground. It was a simple lace, and did not compete with those of Flanders. It was revived in the late 19th century for trimming lingerie and 'fancy linen'.

Point de Paris ground is used in other lace styles as well. It has many other names:

- six-point star - from the shape
- fond chant - it formed the ground of 19th-century Chantilly lace)
- fond double
- Kat stitch - there was a tradition that Catherine of Aragorn started the tradition of Bedfordshire lace
- French ground - it was used in 18th century French peasant lace
- wire ground - the intertwining of the threads looks like a wire mesh

It is also found in Antwerp lace, Chantilly lace and Bucks Point.
