= Bobbin lace ground =

Background mesh in continuous bobbin lace

Bobbin lace ground is the regular small mesh filling the open spaces of continuous bobbin lace. Other names for bobbin lace ground are net or réseau (French for network). The precise course of the threads and the resultant shape of the ground are an important diagnostic feature in lace identification, as different lace styles use different grounds.

== Point ground ==
Point ground is also known as fond simple or simple ground, fond clair, Lille, point, net ground or Bucks Point ground.

Grid angle: 52°-70°, usually 60°, never 45°

It is a simple hexagonal mesh. Each stitch uses a pair of threads on each side. Some threads travel diagonally, and some move to left, then back to right, from stitch to stitch.

This ground is used in Bucks Point, Lille, Chantilly, and blonde lace.

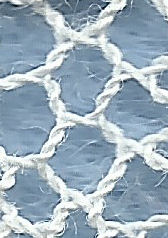
Bucks Point ground

== Torchon ground ==
Torchon ground and double Torchon ground are used in Torchon lace.

Grid angle: 45°

Each stitch uses a pair of threads on each side. In Torchon ground, the threads cross over. In double Torchon ground they cross and return to the same side they started.

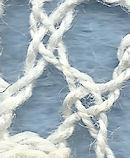
Torchon ground

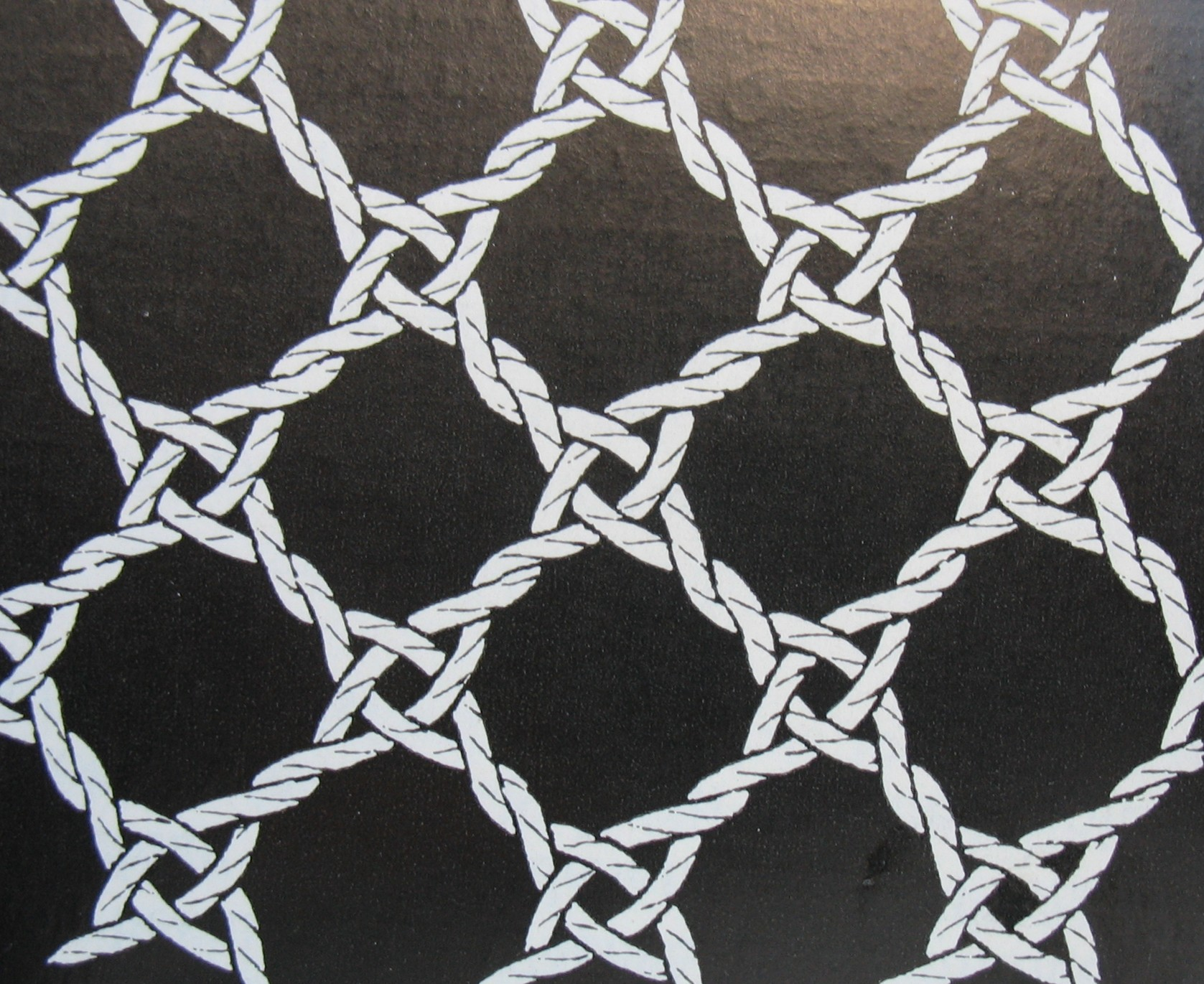
a variation called Dieppe

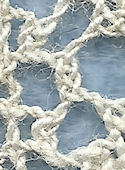
Double torchon ground

== Mechlin ground ==
Mechlin is used in Mechlin lace.

Grid angle: 45°

Each stitch uses a pair of threads on each side. It is similar to double Torchon ground, except there is no pin, and there may be more or less half stitches involved. Similar grounds are Brussels ground, Droschel, vrai reseau and bobbin mesh.

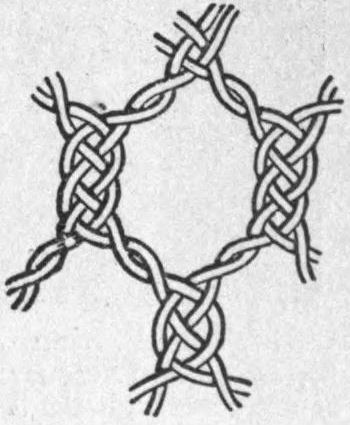
Mechlin ground

== Five Holes Ground ==
This ground is known as Rose ground, Point a la Vierge, fond de Mariage, fond de Flandres is also known as cinq trous or five hole or virgin ground, or rose stitch. Not to be confused with the Dutch Rozengrond, what would be a literal translation but is used for the honeycomb ground.

Grid angle: 45°

The appearance looks like a little rose, and there are four holes in the corners plus one in the centre. Each stitch uses two pairs of threads on each side. There are several different types of rose ground.

It is found in Antwerp and other Flanders lace, early Valenciennes, Torchon lace and yak lace.

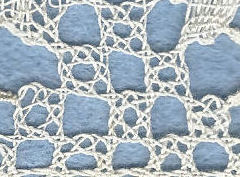
Rose ground in Torchon lace, pins at the edges of each rectangle

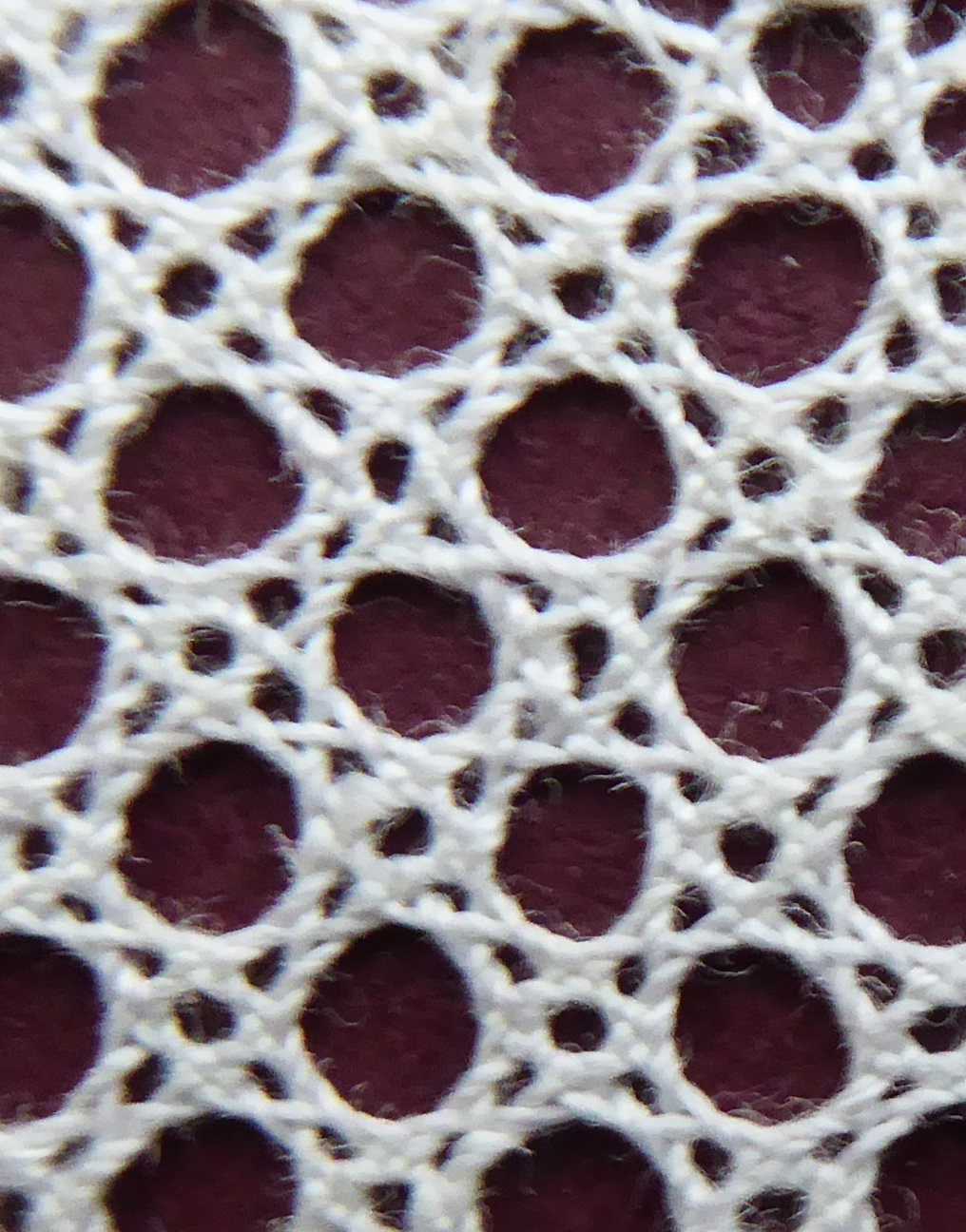
Flanders ground, same stitches, just a pin in the center of each rectangle

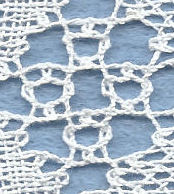
Another form of Rose ground, applying the double Torchon ground

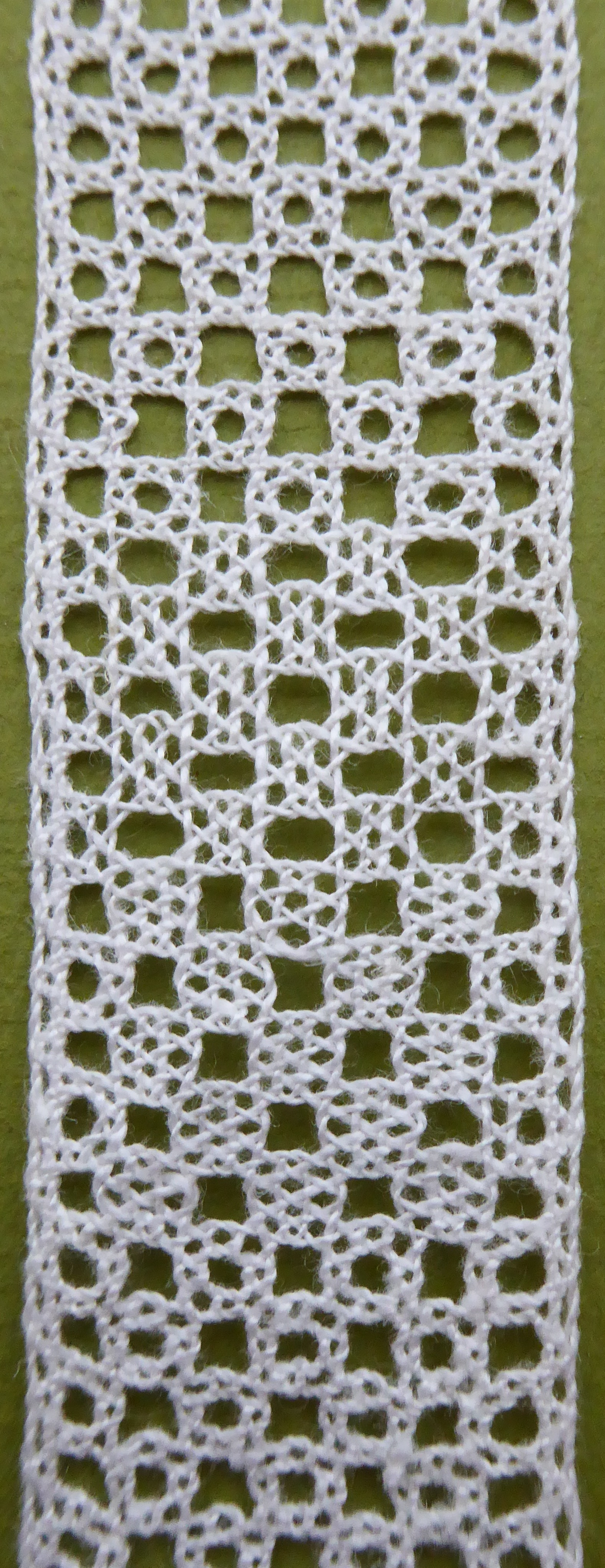
Rose ground sampler

== Point de Paris ==
Point de Paris is also called fond double or double ground, Kat stitch, wire, French, six-point star, star, star-pointed ground, hairpin stitch, fond chant.

The ground has hexagons and triangles, making a star-shaped mesh.

It is found in point de Paris, and in some Bucks point lace, Chantilly, Antwerp lace and Ipswich lace.

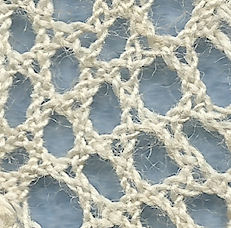
Point de Paris

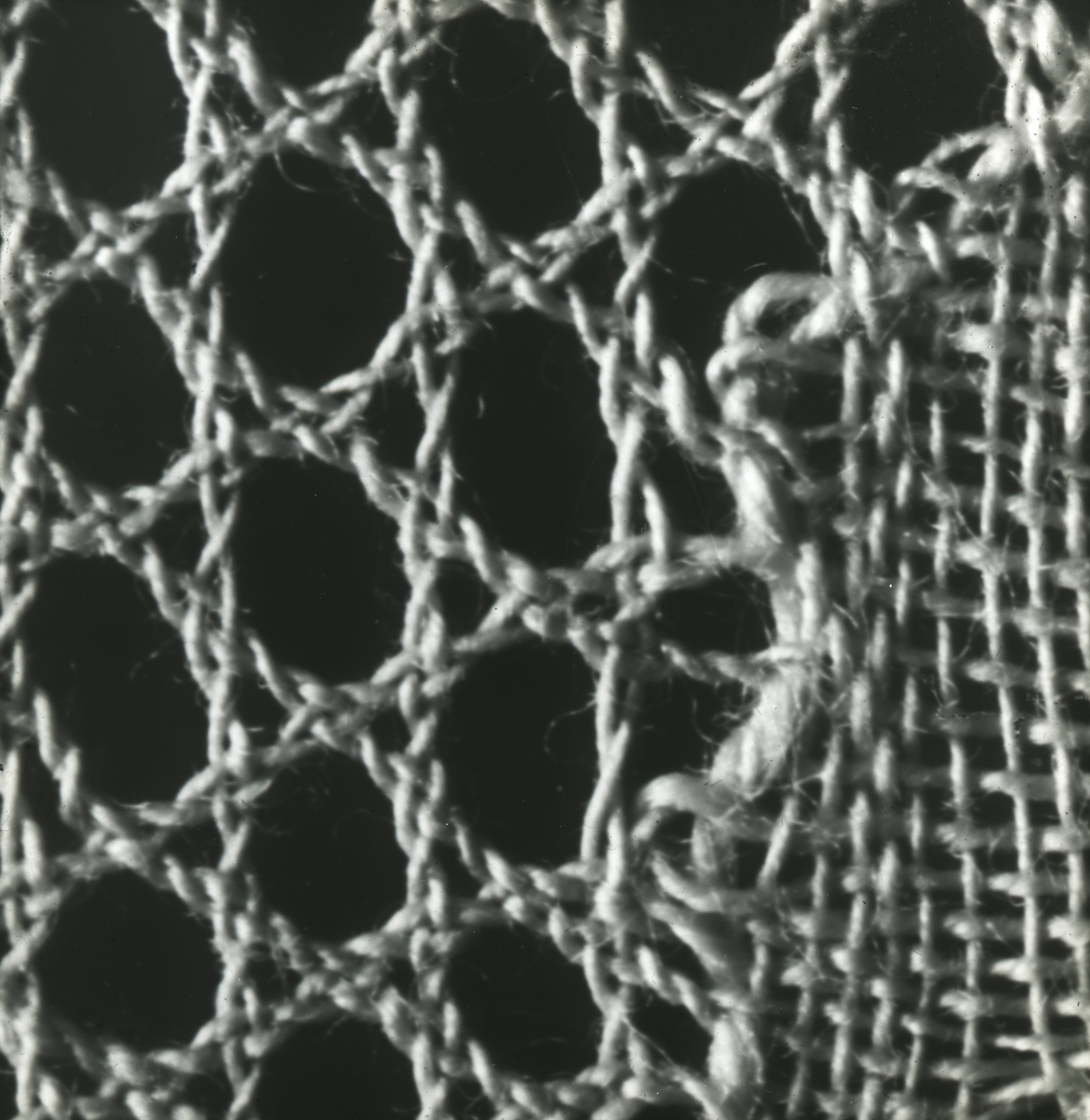

== Valenciennes ground ==
Valenciennes ground is also known as square or diamond mesh.

Each stitch uses two pairs of threads on each side, which are plaited between the stitches. This gives the distinctive diamond look to the ground.

This ground is used in Valenciennes lace.

Valenciennes ground

== Snowflake ground ==
Snowflake ground is also known as fond de neige, partridge eye or oeil de perdix.

This ground is the characteristic ground of Binche lace, and is sometimes found in Mechlin lace.

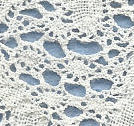
ringed snowflake ground

== Honeycomb ground ==
Honeycomb ground is also known as fond de mariage.

Grid angle: usually 60°

This ground is found in Bucks Point. It is also used in Chantilly lace and Binche lace.

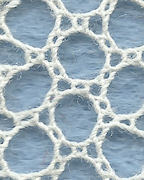
Honeycomb ground
