= Yak lace =

Type of wool bobbin lace

Yak lace refers to a coarse bobbin lace in the guipure manner, typically made from wool. It was mainly made in Oxfordshire, Buckinghamshire and Northamptonshire in imitation of Maltese and Greek laces. While the name suggests the lace is made using yak hair, it can be made of any wool or worsted yarn. An example of yak lace in the Pitt Rivers Museum collection illustrates the Torchon style motifs common in this lace.

Although woollen laces had been made since the 17th century, it was not until the mid 19th century that "yak lace" became popular. Despite the difficulty of working with naturally elastic woollen yarn which meant that the lace instantly shrank to two thirds of its size once unpinned from the pillow, it was inexpensive, quick and easy to make and became popular and widely used. Yak lace could be produced in various weights, ranging from lightweight trimmings for children's dresses and underwear, to heavier, upholstery-weight lace suitable for curtains. Black yak lace was also widely used for mourning dress. Examples of woolen lace in other colors exist in archives. The popularity of woollen lace was boosted by the nineteenth century hygienist Gustav Jäger's promotion of wool fabrics.
