= Bayeux lace =

Type of bobbin lace from Bayeux, France

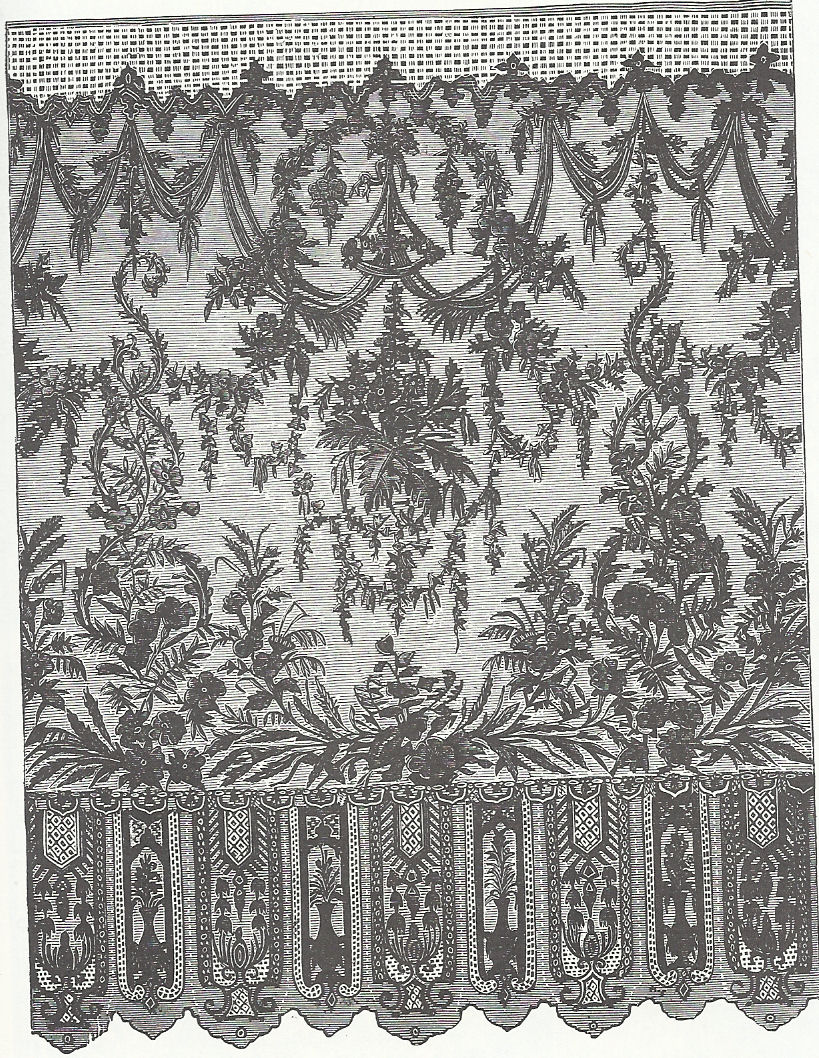
Bayeux lace, late 19C

Bayeux lace was bobbin lace that was made at Bayeux in Normandy, France.

Caen was one of the major centres of the Bayeux lacemaking area. Three types of lace were produced there from the early 19th century under the management of Auguste Lefebure:

- the original blonde de Caen, with its sprinkling of point d'esprit in the cobwebby ground, and the suggestion of curved petals of shiny white silk along the border
- blonde mate (as in matt, a smooth close texture) in the Spanish style, made from 1829
- the grillé blanc (French meaning a mesh or grill, half stitch), a form of white Chantilly lace, fashionable 1800-1820, with a fond simple ground, with floral sprays worked in half stitch, using silk or flax.

From 1850s, mainly black lace was produced.
