= Beveren lace =

Type of bobbin lace made in Beveren

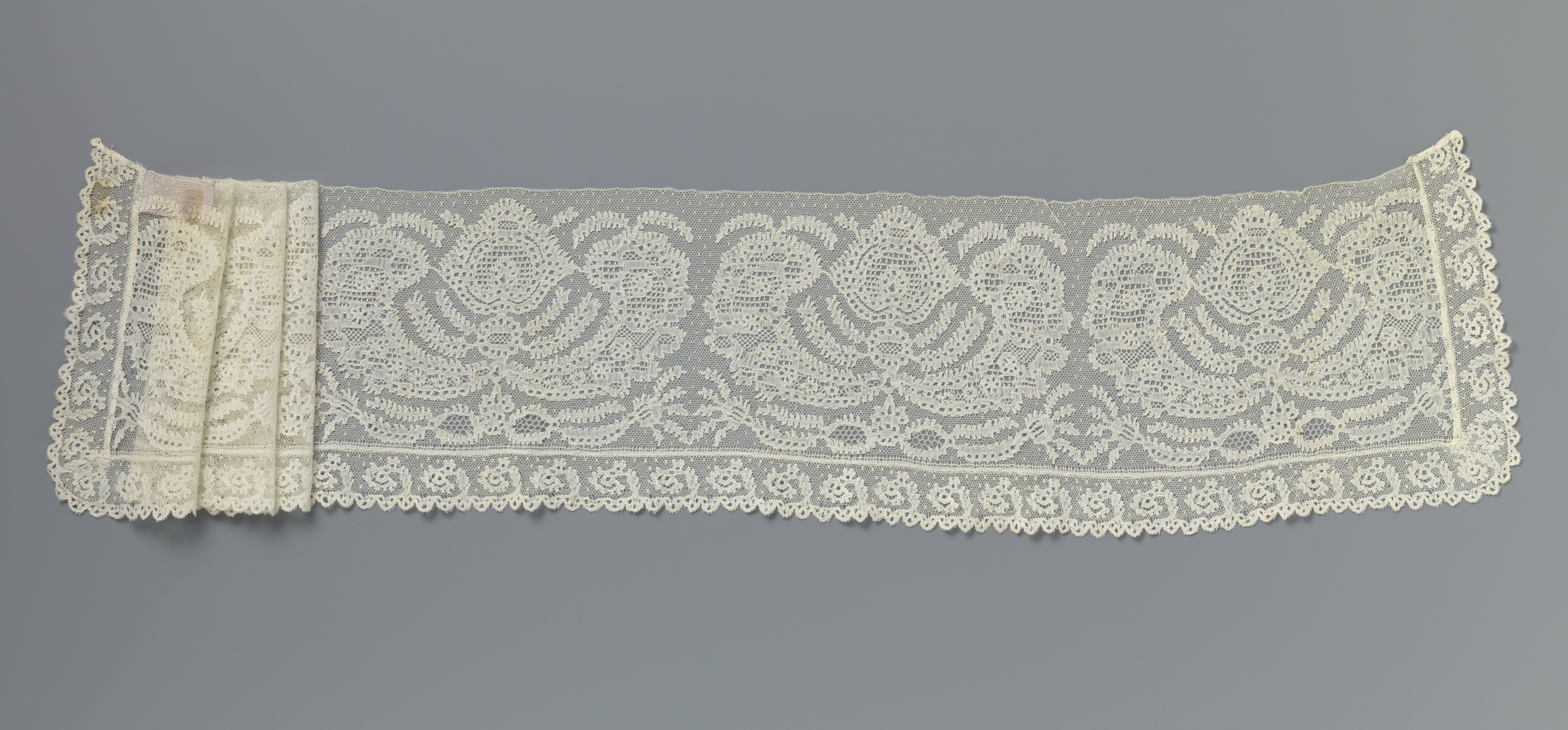
Strook kloskant met gestileerde ronde bloem tussen twee dikke c-voluten, BK-1970-328

Beveren lace was bobbin lace that was made at Beveren a few miles west of Antwerp. Lille lace, as well, as Belgium laces, was made there in the nineteenth century.

The characteristics of Beveren lace are:

- It is a continuous lace, where the whole lace is made at the same time.
- The headside often has a straight border, adorned with picots.
- Typical motifs are flowers (feathers), accentuated by a gimp thread.
- There are square tallies or leaves.
