= Bucks point lace =

Type of bobbin lace from South East England

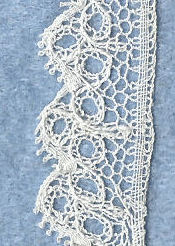
Example of a simple Bucks point edging

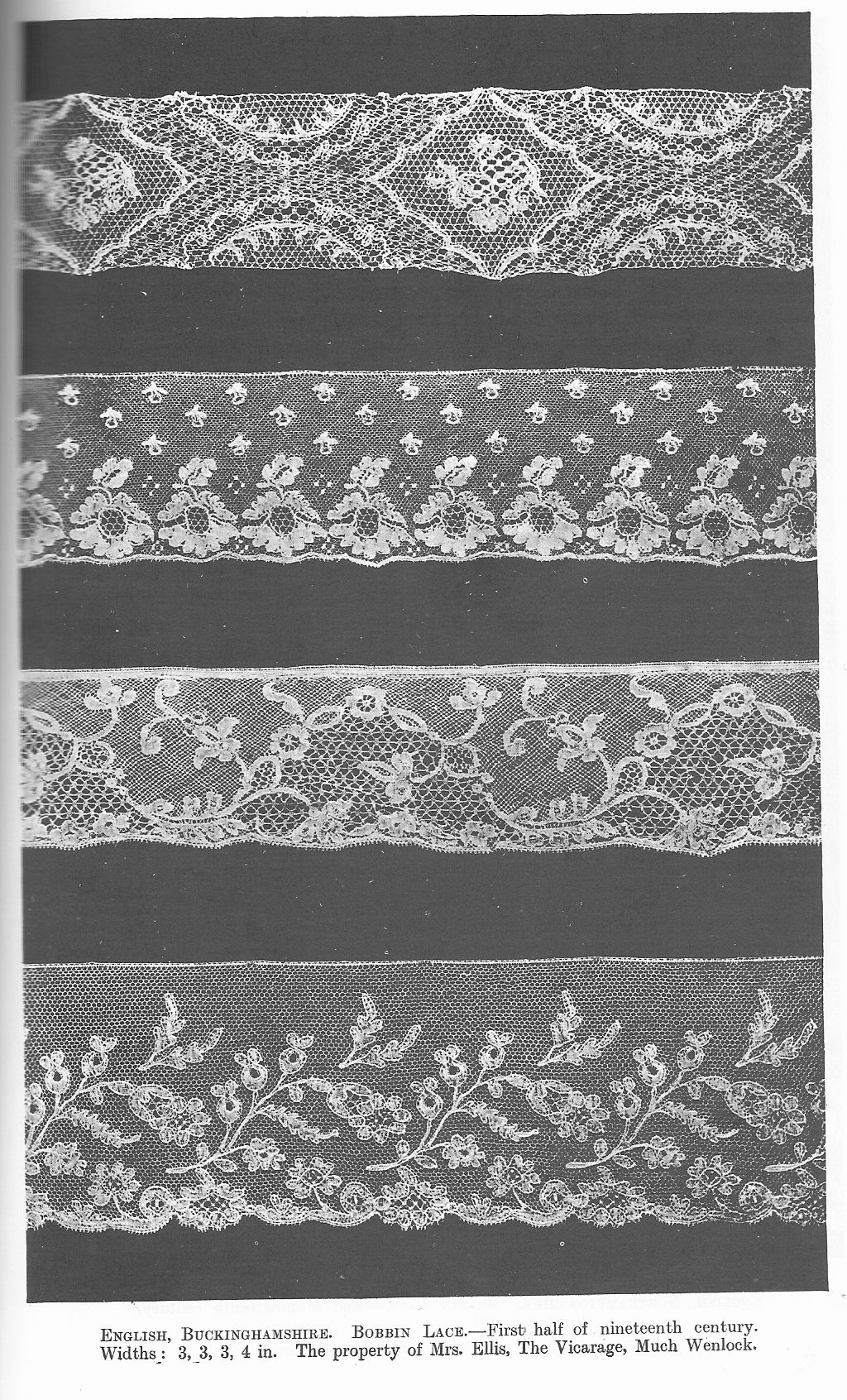
Bucks Point lace from first half of 19th century

Bucks point is a bobbin lace from the South East of England. "Bucks" is short for Buckinghamshire, which was the main centre of production. The lace was also made in the nearby counties of Bedfordshire and Northamptonshire. Bucks point is very similar to the French Lille lace, and thus is often called English Lille. It is also similar to Mechlin lace and Chantilly lace.

Bucks point is made in one piece on the lace pillow, at full width. Point ground or sometimes honeycomb ground are used as the background stitches. A gimp thread outlines the pattern. Common designs are floral and geometric. The floral designs are like those in Mechlin and Lille laces, but Bucks lace is generally simpler than the Belgian laces. Some Bucks point laces have picots along the edge.

== History ==
Although Buckinghamshire was a centre of English lacemaking from as early as the 16th century, the styles of the lace made would have varied at different periods, reflecting what was fashionable at the time. The style referred to as Bucks Point lace did not appear until the end of the 18th century. It seems to have been based on contemporary Mechlin lace, but with Mechlin ground replaced by a simpler point ground to give a lighter lace as had become popular at the time.

Bucks point lace can also be created in colored threads, as a type of polychrome lace.
