= Binche lace =

Type of bobbin lace from Binche, Belgium

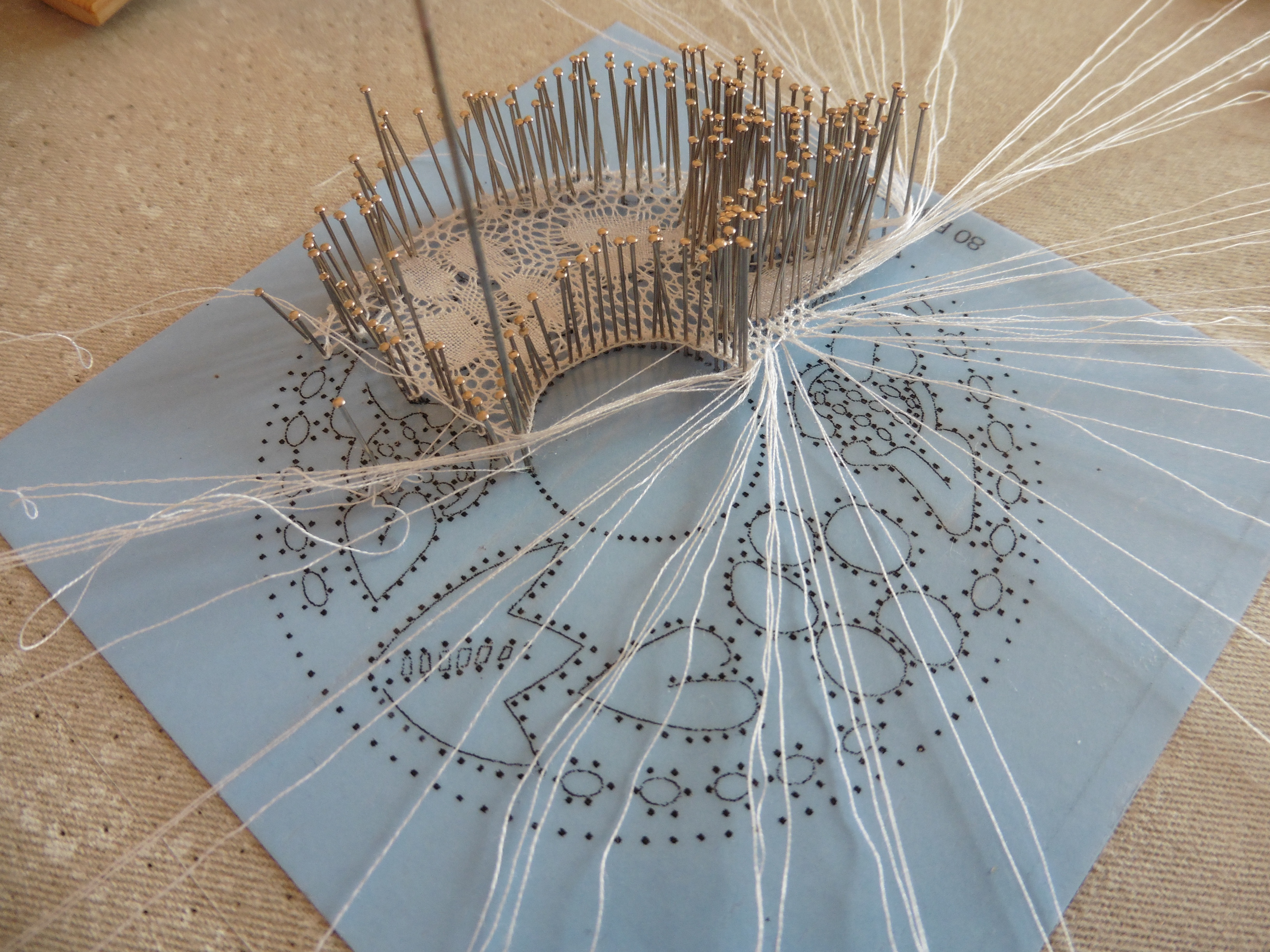
Binche Lace 02

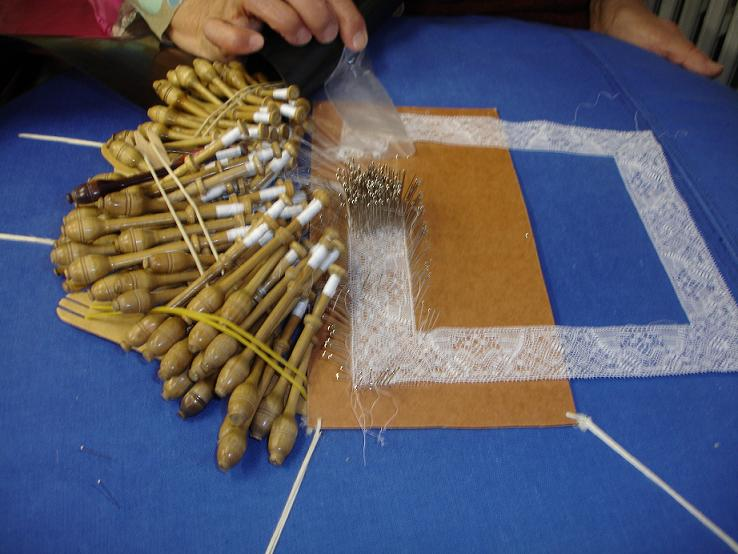
Binche lace

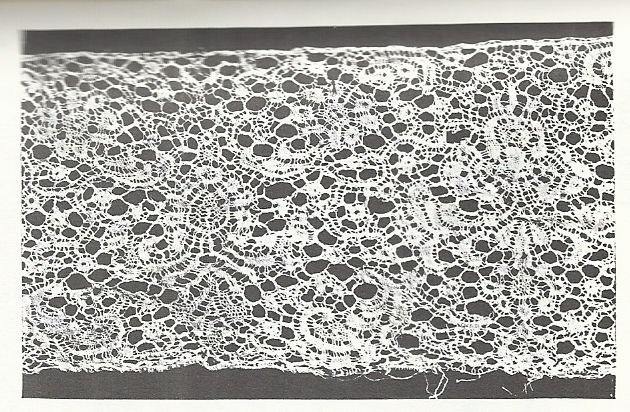
Binche lace

Binche lace is a type of bobbin lace that originated in the town of Binche, Belgium. It is continuous, meaning it is made all at once, in one piece. It is generally made in strips 2 inches (5 cm) wide. Though typically it has no cordonnet outlining the design against the ground, occasional pieces are made with a very fine one, about the same thickness as the thread used in the pattern. The pattern in Binche lace is very detailed, with animal scenes and figures.

Binche lace is sometimes known as "fairy lace".

== History ==
Tradition says that Binche lace was started in the 15th century by lacemakers that moved to Binche from Ghent with Mary of Burgundy, however there is no proof for this legend. However, Binche lace was being made by the end of the 16th century. In 1585, when the river Scheldt was closed to shipping, Binche did not suffer a decline in its lacemaking as did others up the river such as Antwerp lace. Binche lace was the subject of a royal edict in 1686, which implies that the lace must have been fairly important. The heyday of Binche lace was in the 18th century, when it was popular in Parisian circles. It began to die out at the end of the 18th century, and was not made much during or after the 19th century. In 1862 Victor Hugo mentioned Binche lace as the material of Cosette's wedding gown in Les Misérables, as he remembered it from his youth as being a lace of great beauty. The quality of Binche lace declined at the end of the 18th century, with the lace becoming coarser and the patterns less detailed. Originally Binche lace resembled Valenciennes lace.

In the 20th century there was another lace called Binche lace, that consisted of bobbin-made patterns sewn onto machine-made net, like Brussels lace. However, it was of inferior quality, and thus was never very common.
