= Torchon lace =

Continuous, geometric bobbin lace

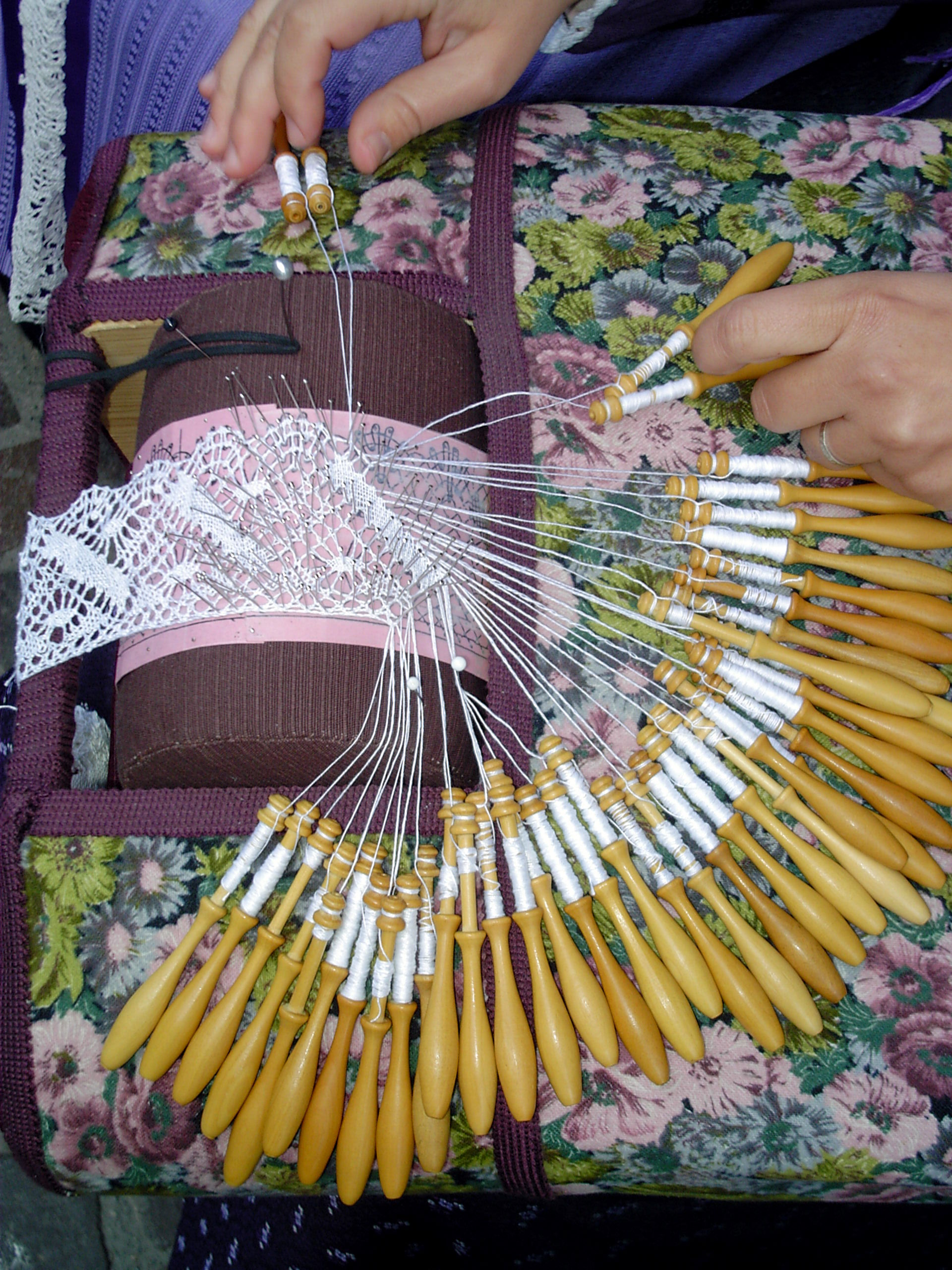
Fabrication of traditional Torchon lace

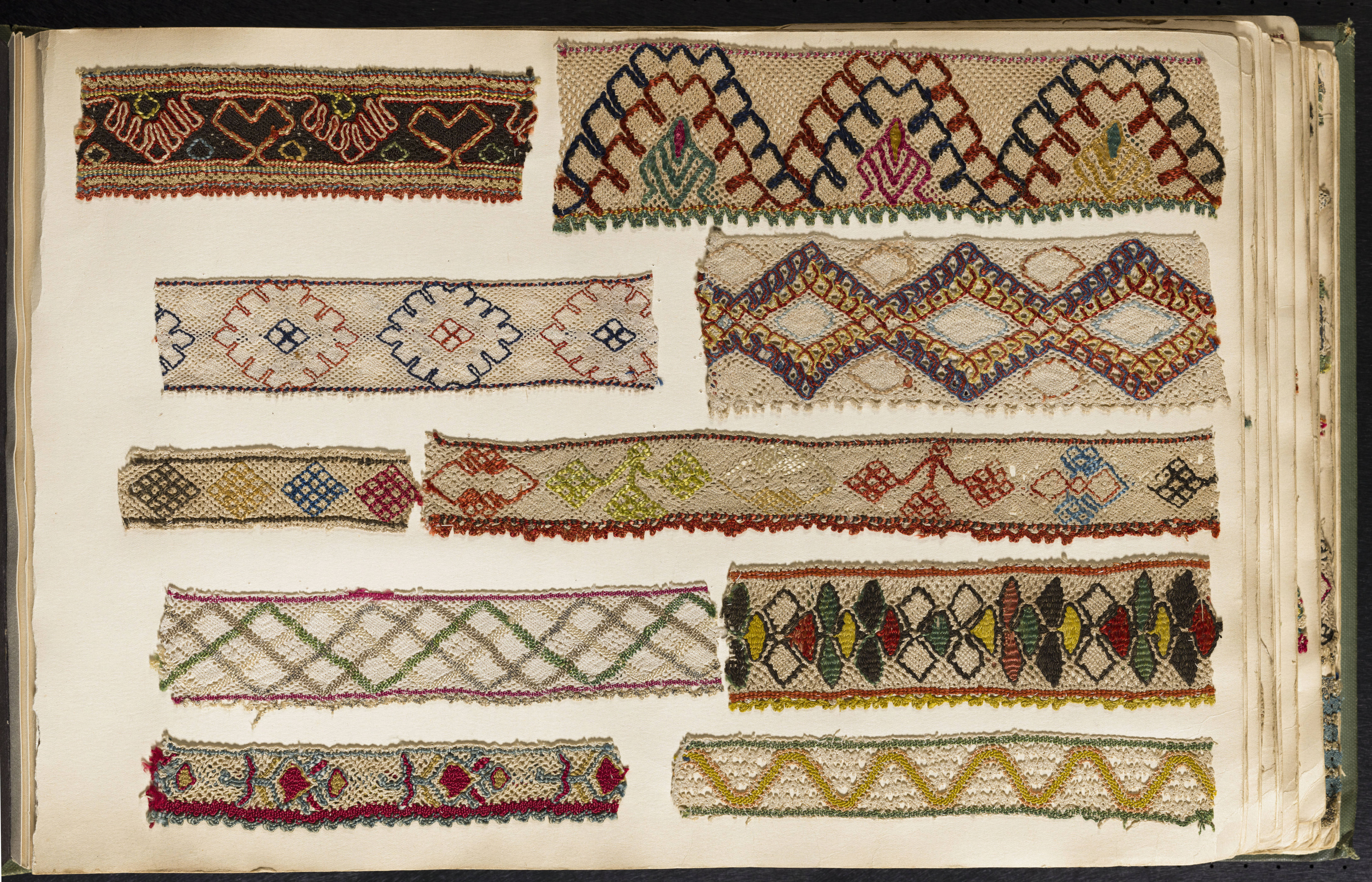
A page of a larger lace collection, with emphasis on Eastern and Middle European Peasant laces

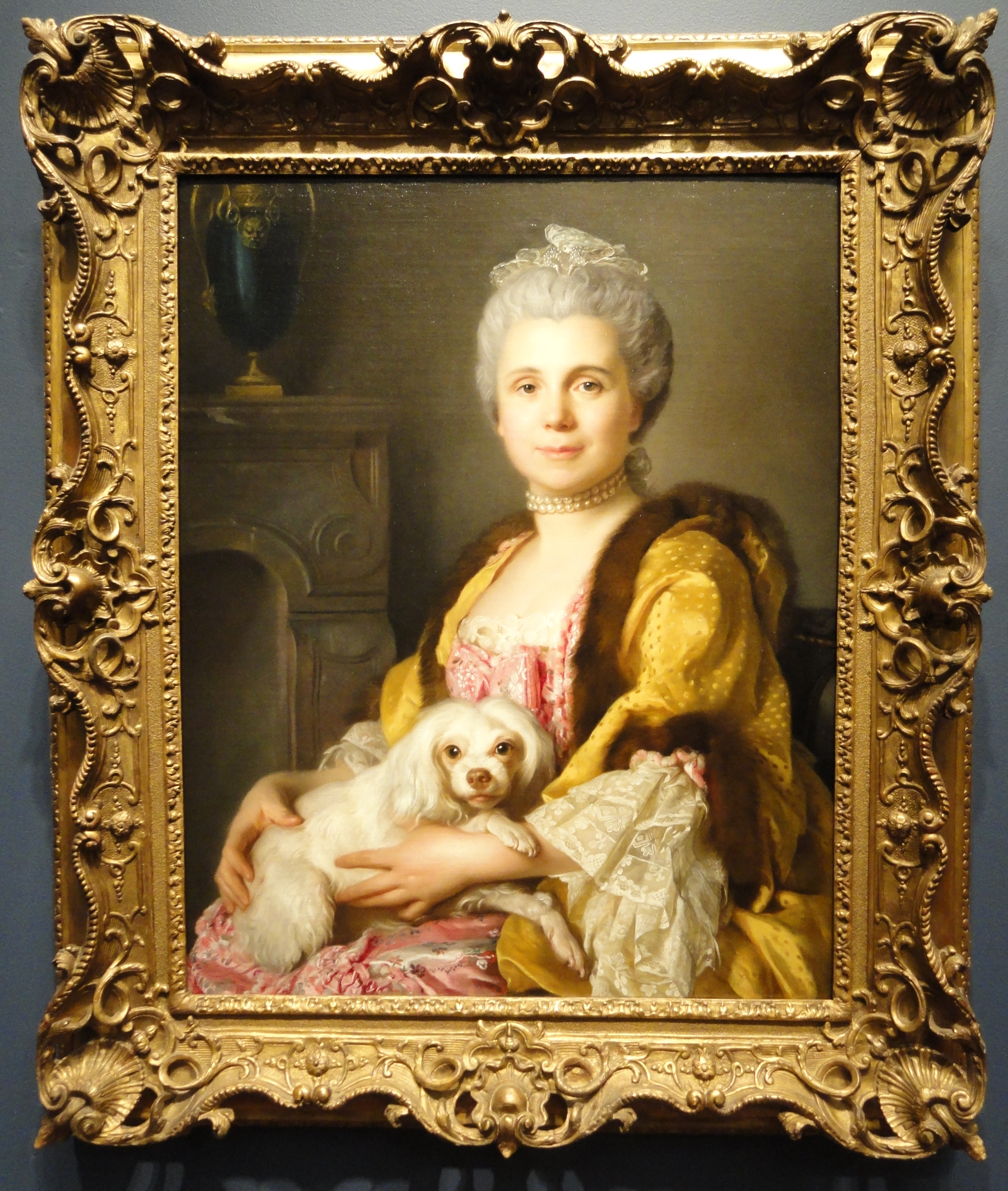
Portrait of Madame Freret Dericour, by Duplessis, 1769. The engageante contains a Torchon-like section.

Torchon lace (Dutch: stropkant) is a bobbin lace that was made all over Europe. It is continuous, with the pattern made at the same time as the ground. Typical basic stitches include whole stitch, half stitch, and twists, and common motifs include spiders and fans. Torchon lace was notable historically for being coarse and strong, as well as consisting of simple geometric patterns and straight lines. It did not use representational designs, for the most part.

== History ==
The exact origins of Torchon style laces are unclear. Evidence from portraiture does indicate that a Torchon-like lace trim, with typical 45 degree angled ground and motifs outlined with heavier gimp threads, may presage the development of the lace now known as Torchon, as well as other laces sometimes called "peasant lace". Examples of the geometric style laces have been identified from the 17th century. The word is derived from the French term for "dishcloth", and may suggest that the lace was a more durable and sturdy lace than some other fashionable laces. It was in the 19th century that the term for this style of lace became attached to the characteristic angular forms and motifs we think of today. Torchon lace was used by the middle classes for edging or insertion, and also to trim cotton and linen underwear, where it was ideal because of its strength and because it was inexpensive. Torchon lace was originally made from flax, but cotton is used as well, and has been for a long time.Traditionally it was made in strips 1 to 2 inches (2.5 to 5 cm) wide. Torchon lace generally has a gimp outlining the pattern. The gimp was first used in Sweden, but now is used generally.

Colored threads were occasionally used historically, but in general Western European Torchon lace was typically white. However, a number of laces that are sometimes termed "peasant lace" use similar motifs, and many of these can be found with very effective and vibrant color combinations especially in Eastern European traditions.

Torchon lace is one of the oldest laces, and is common to many lace-making regions such as Belgium, France, Italy, Saxony, Sweden and Spain. Due to its simplicity, torchon lace is generally the first lace a lacemaker learns to make, and has been since at least the 19th century. It only requires a few bobbins and uses thicker thread than other laces, which makes it easier to learn on. It is also the simplest of all the grounded laces. Beggar's lace is an alternative term for torchon lace.

Though it is one of the oldest laces, torchon lace was not made in England until the late 19th century, at which point it was made in the East Midlands, thus it is not considered an English lace. By the early 20th century, machine-made copies were being made that were almost indistinguishable from the hand-made lace.

=== Modern ===
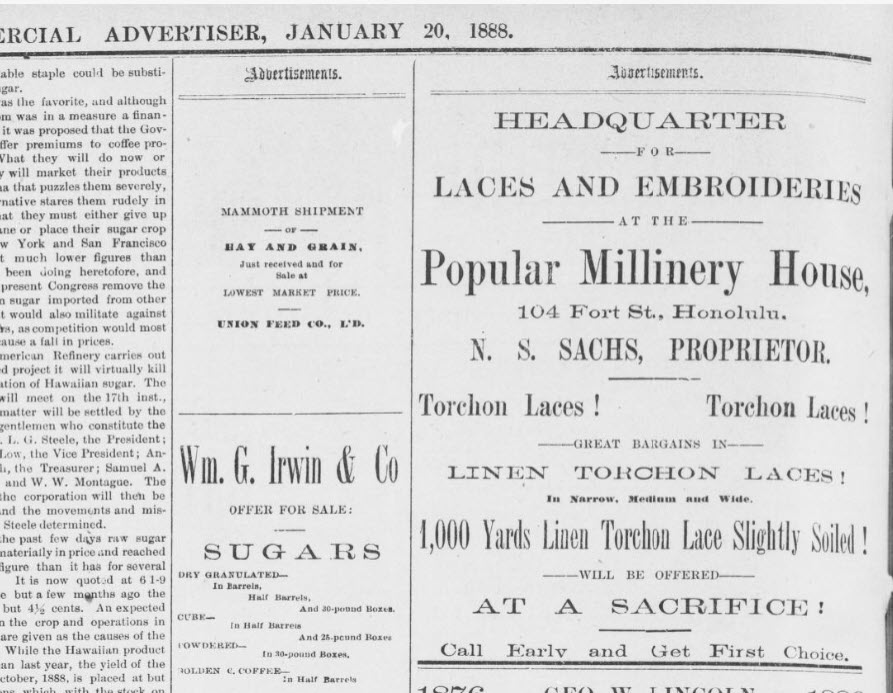
Advertisement for Torchon Lace in Hawaii in 1888

Modern Torchon lace making includes many kinds and colors of objects, no longer limited to the edging or insertion strips of the historical interest, although patterns are available to recreate many samples of these types. Grids of 60 degrees can be employed with Torchon stitches to make round items. New designs and motifs are available to lacemakers, sometimes with extensive use of colors and beads. Public art with Torchon lace objects can be viewed as part of the Headford Lace project in Ireland. Torchon can even be used at much larger scale with recycled materials and larger cables to make public art installations, such as those seen in the work of Mary Elizabeth Barron. Artists like Jane Atkinson have brought Torchon lace into the 21st century with new patterns and colors. Using lace artwork to address issues such as climate change bring new views and perspectives to environmental issues. In 2026, Unagh McCullough was recognized for her lace design and teaching Torchon lace in the King's Birthday Honours list and made a Member of the Order of the British Empire (MBE), for "services to the art of lacemaking and needlecraft".

== Gallery ==
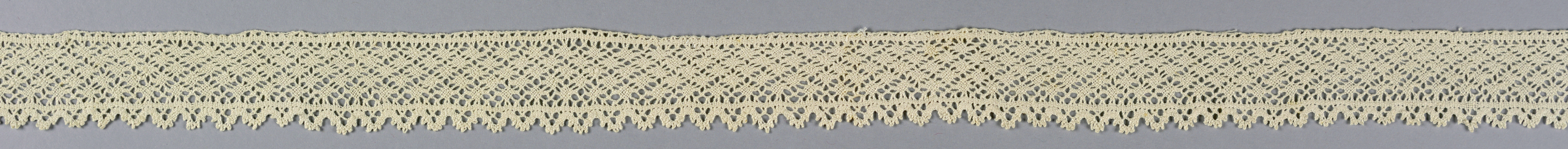
Band (Italy), 17th–18th century (CH 18339099)

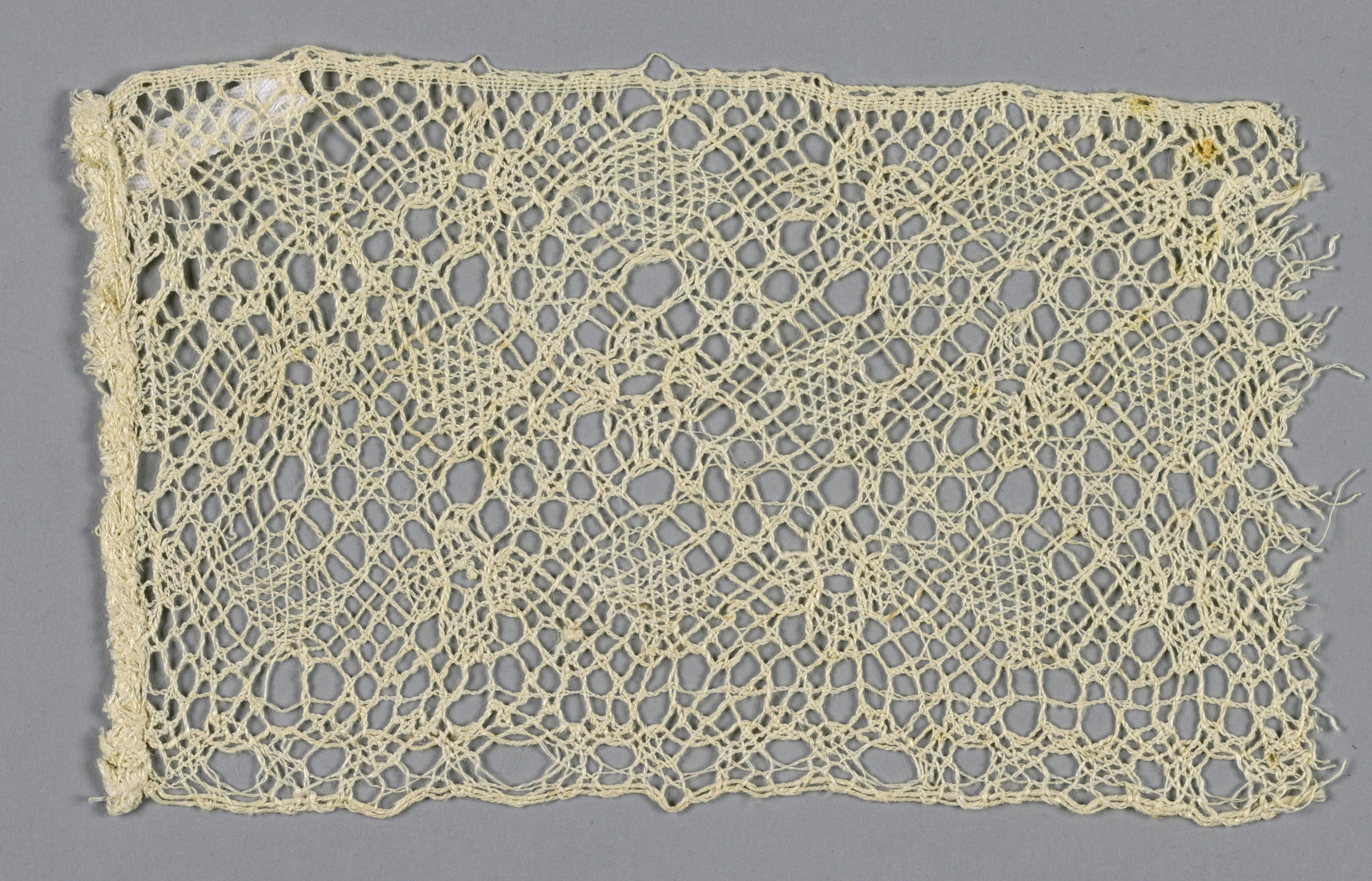

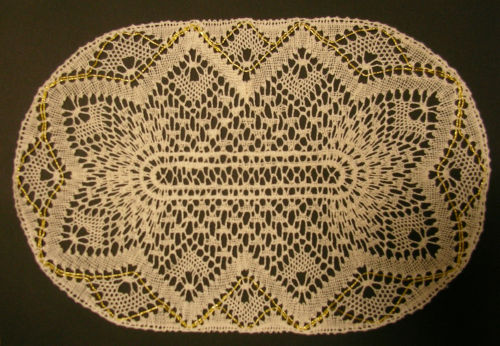

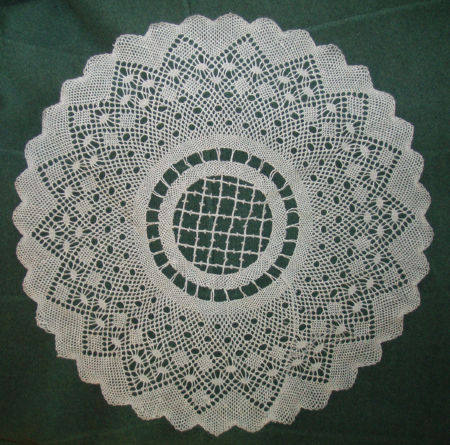
half stitch motifs, spiders

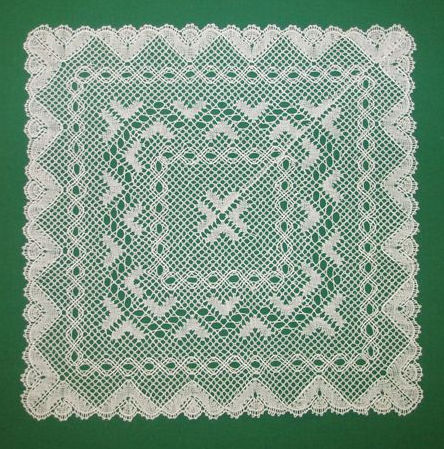
cloth stitch motifs, gimp

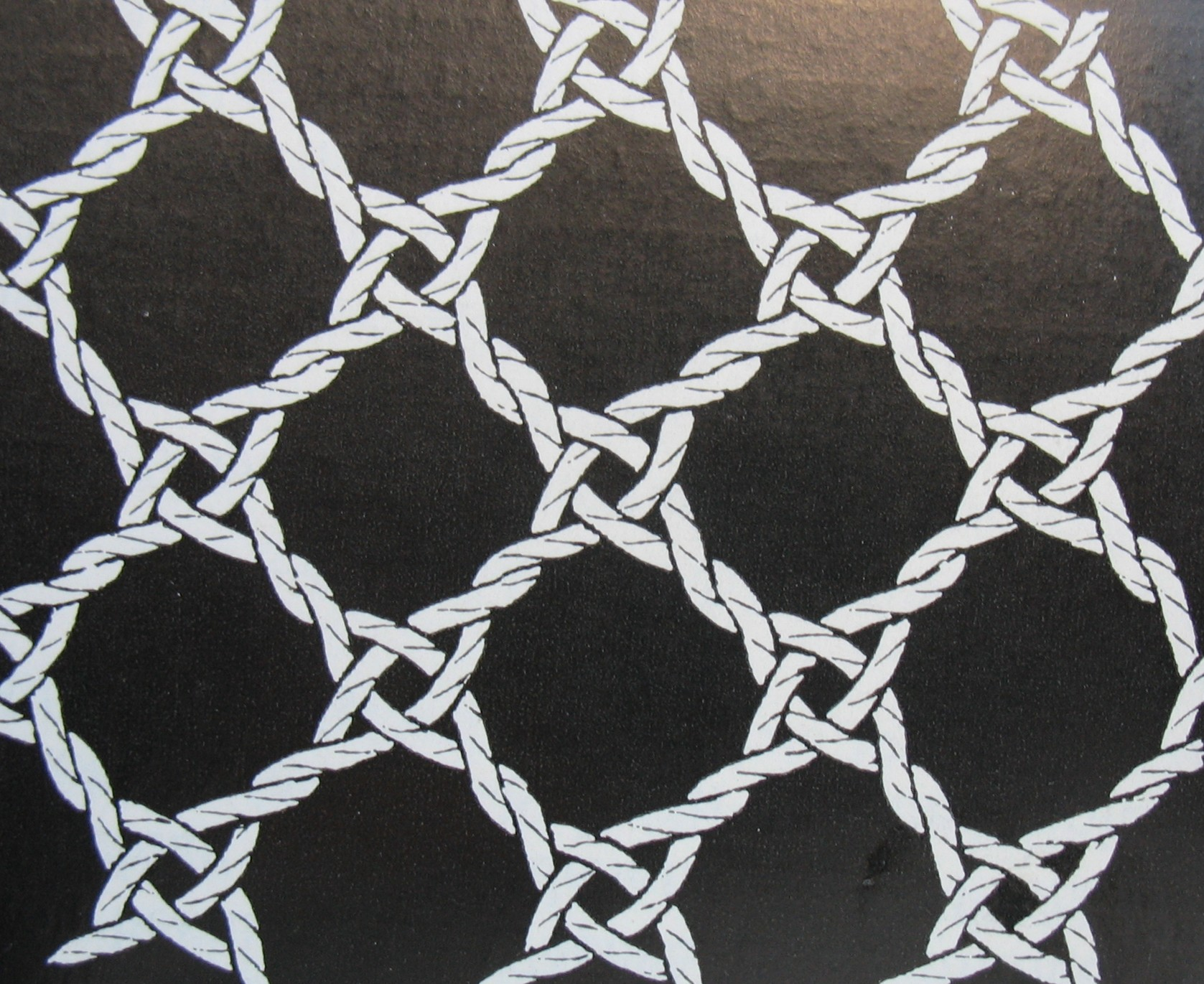
basic ground

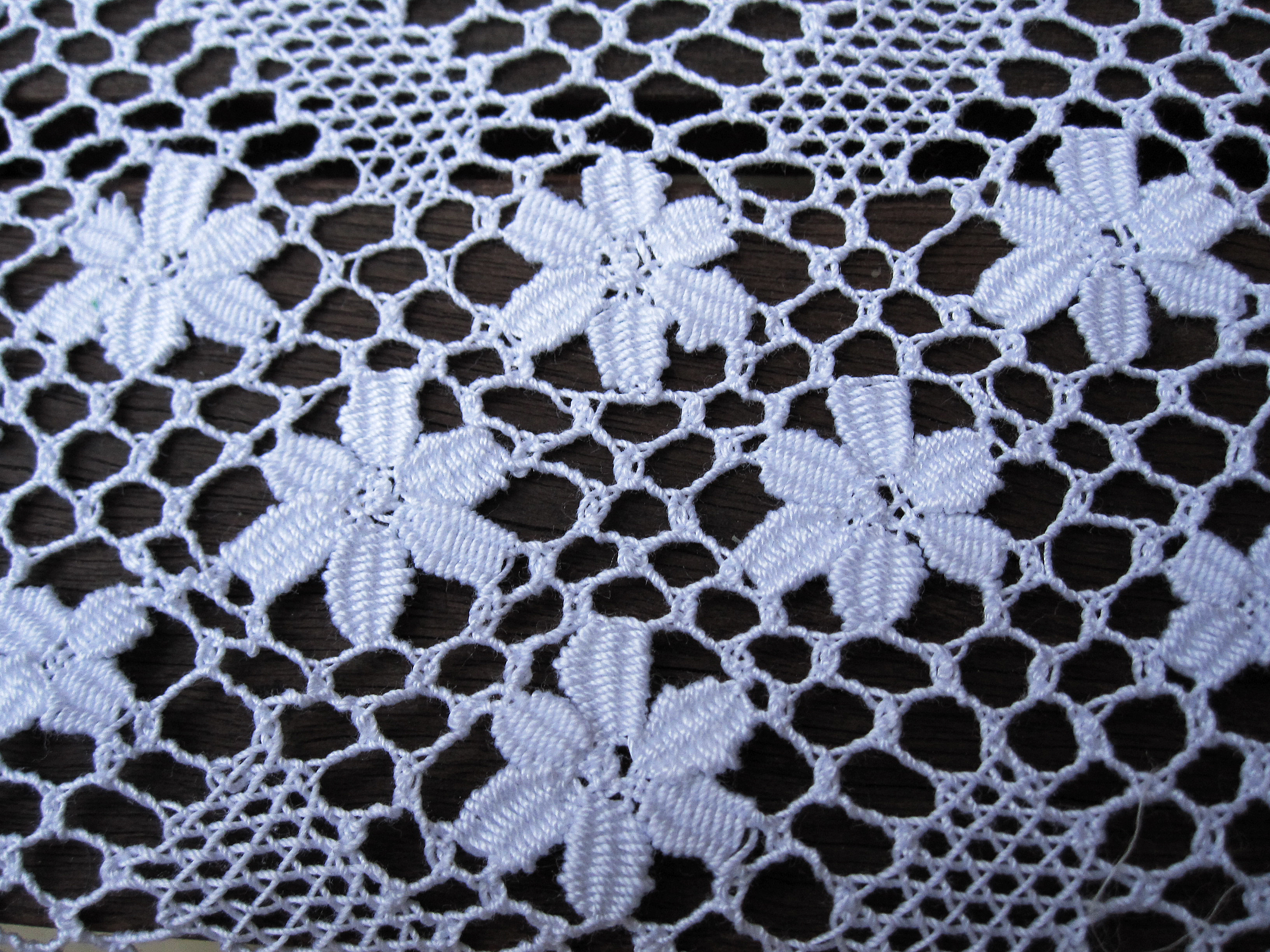
leaves

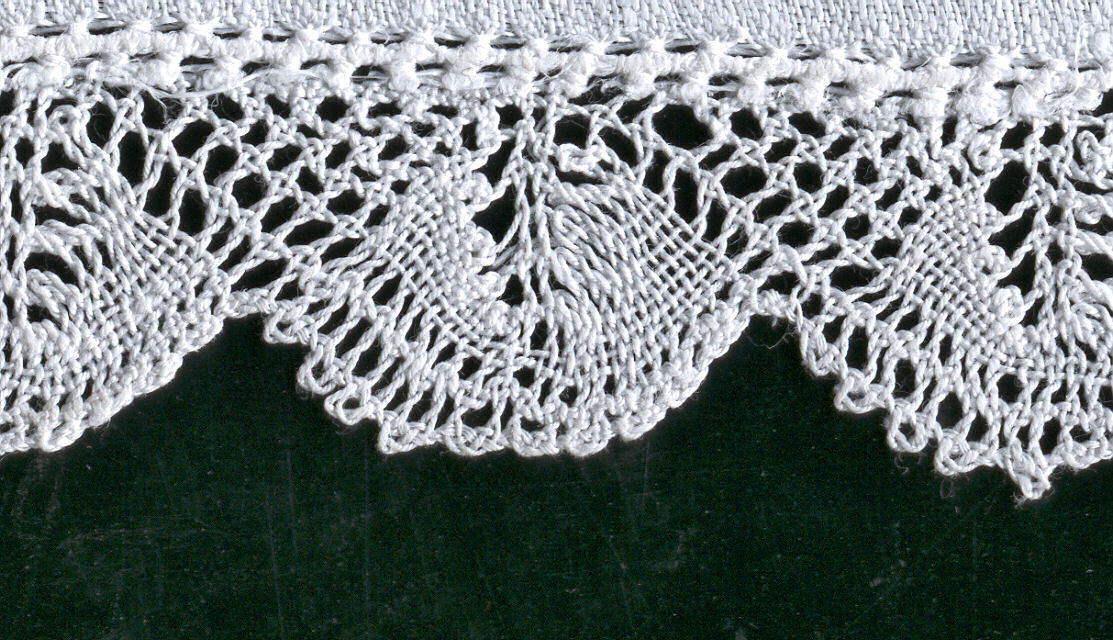
fans and basic ground

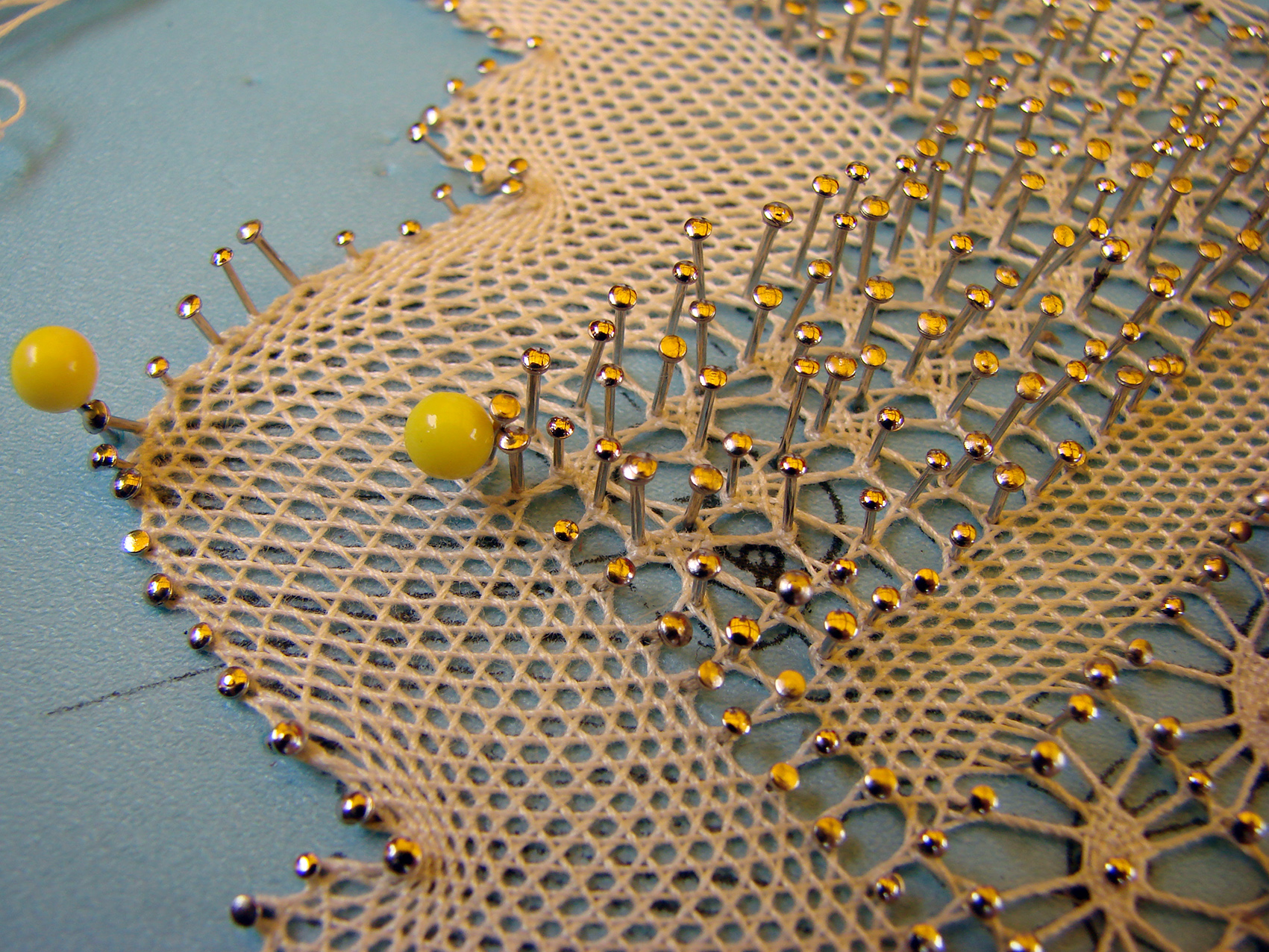
still pinned on the pillow

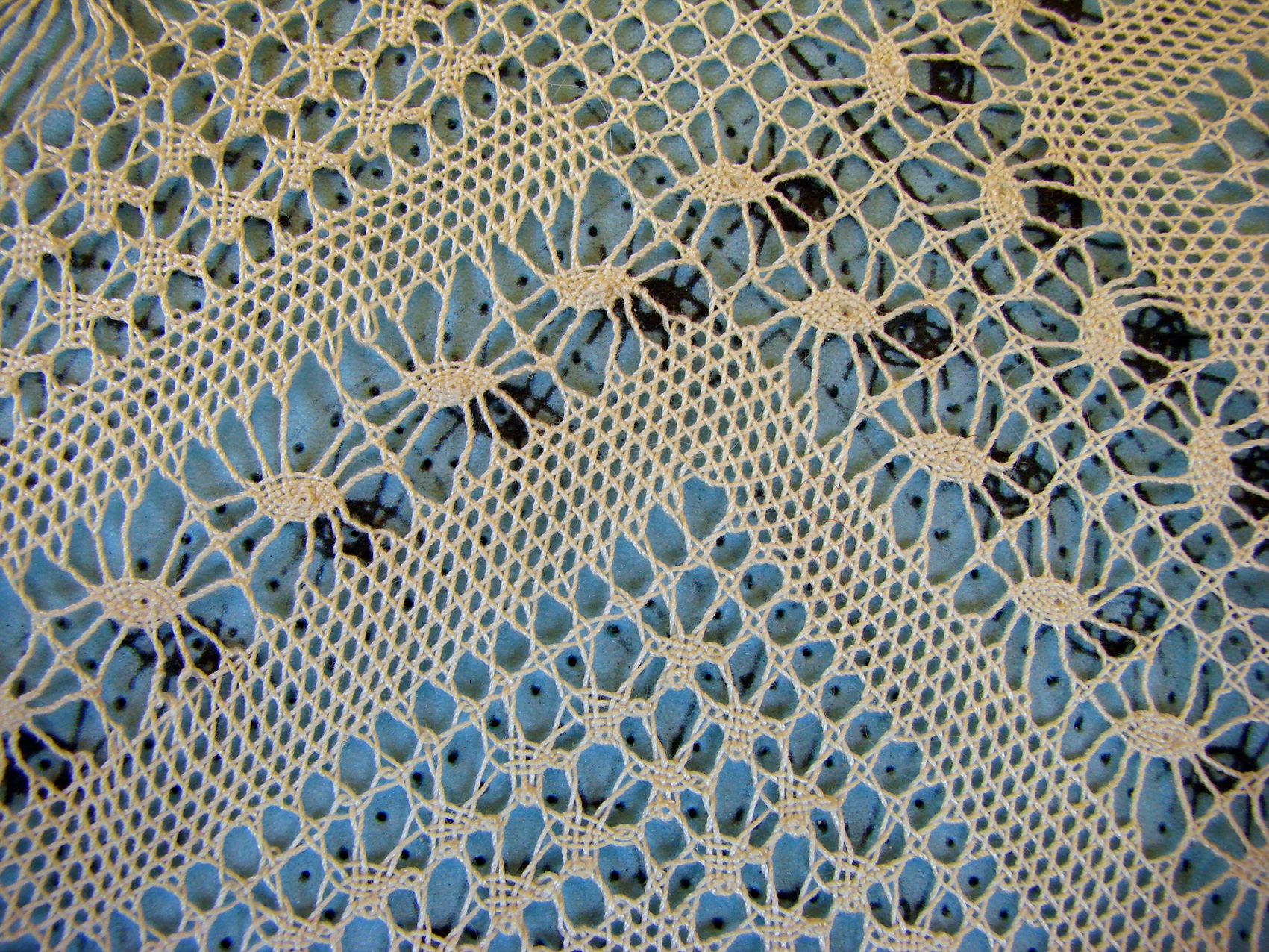
half stitch motifs, spiders, an asymmetrical ground

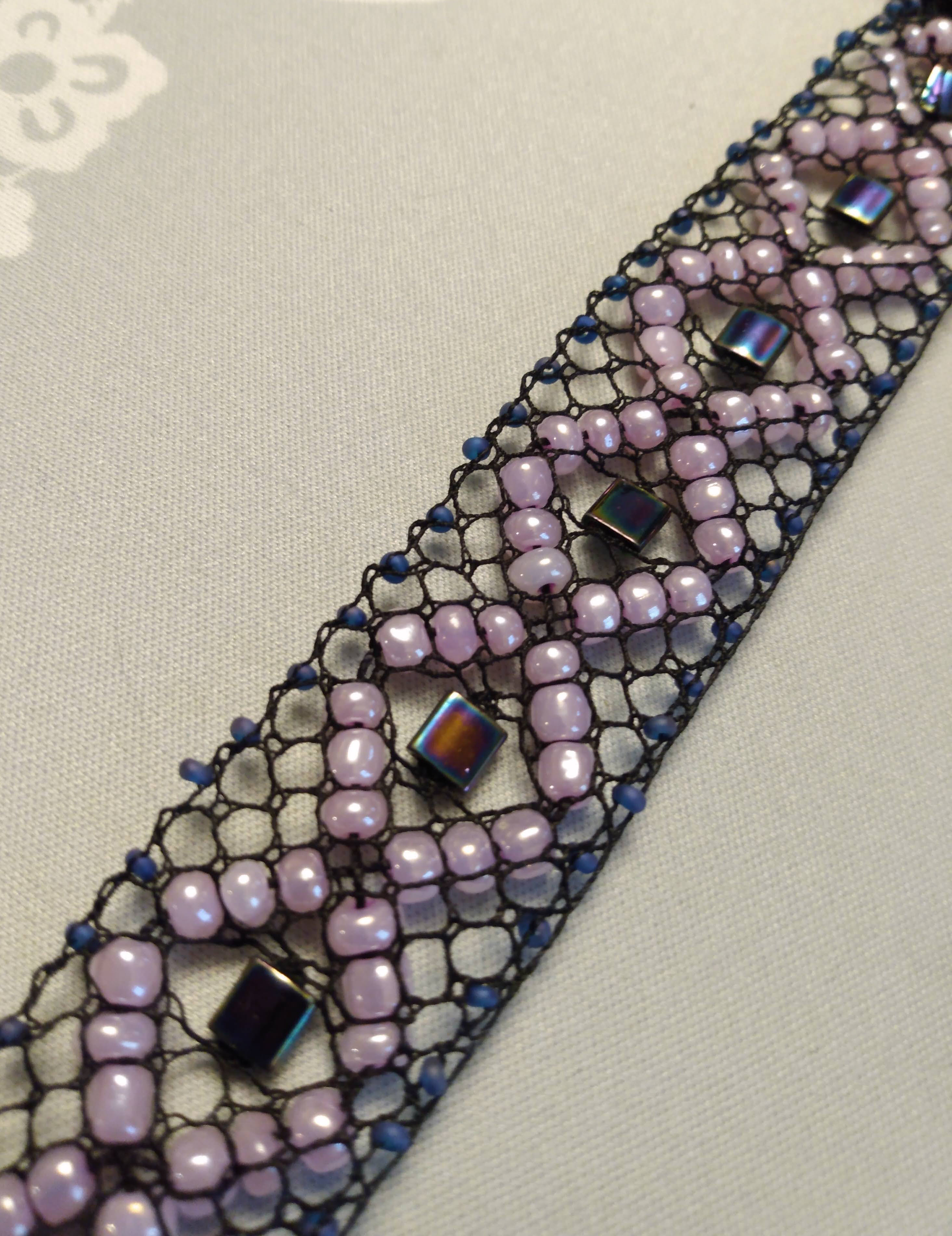
