= Gimp (thread) =

Narrow yarn of thread wrapped around a core

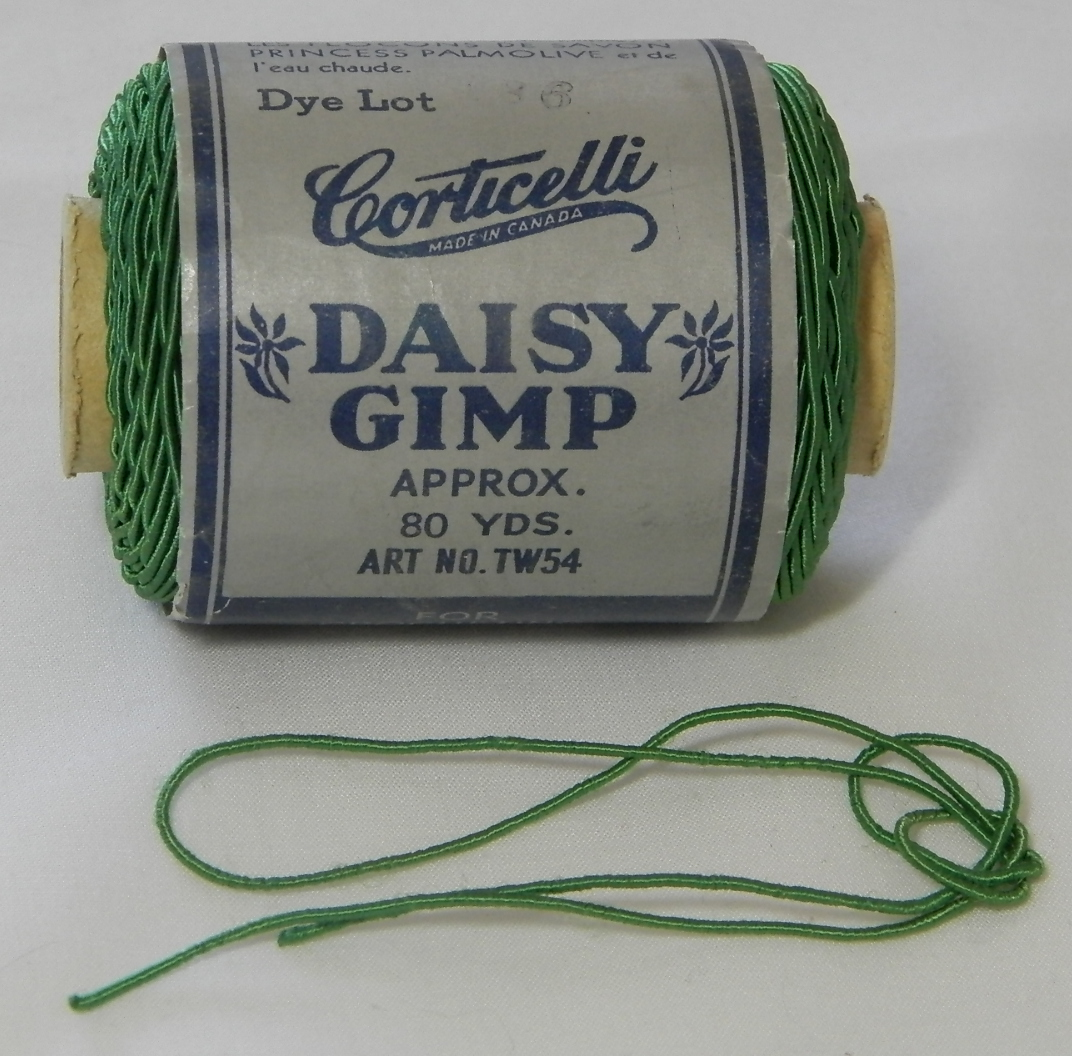
Spool of Daisy gimp thread

Gimp is a narrow ornamental trim used in sewing or embroidery. It is made of silk, wool, polyester, or cotton and is often stiffened with metallic wire or coarse cord running through it. Gimp is used as trimming for dresses, curtains, furniture, etc. Originally the term referred to a thread with a cord or wire in the center, but now is mainly used for a trimming braided or twisted from this thread. Sometimes gimp is covered in beads or spangles.

== History ==
The term "gimp" for a braided trim has been around since the 15th and 16th centuries, when gimp threads were braided into flat braids up to a quarter of an inch (7 mm) wide. The braids were sometimes made either with bobbins or needle and thread, which gave greater control over the threads. Gimp trim was then sewn down to form designs.

The name "gimp" has also been applied to the plastic thread used in the knotting and plaiting craft scoubidou.

== In lace ==
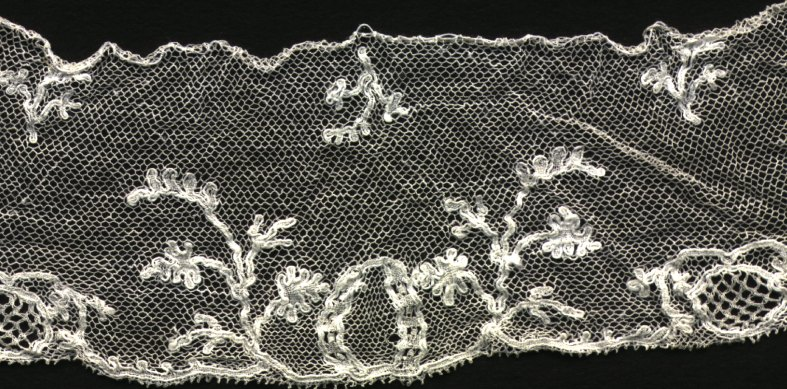
Mechlin lace with gimp

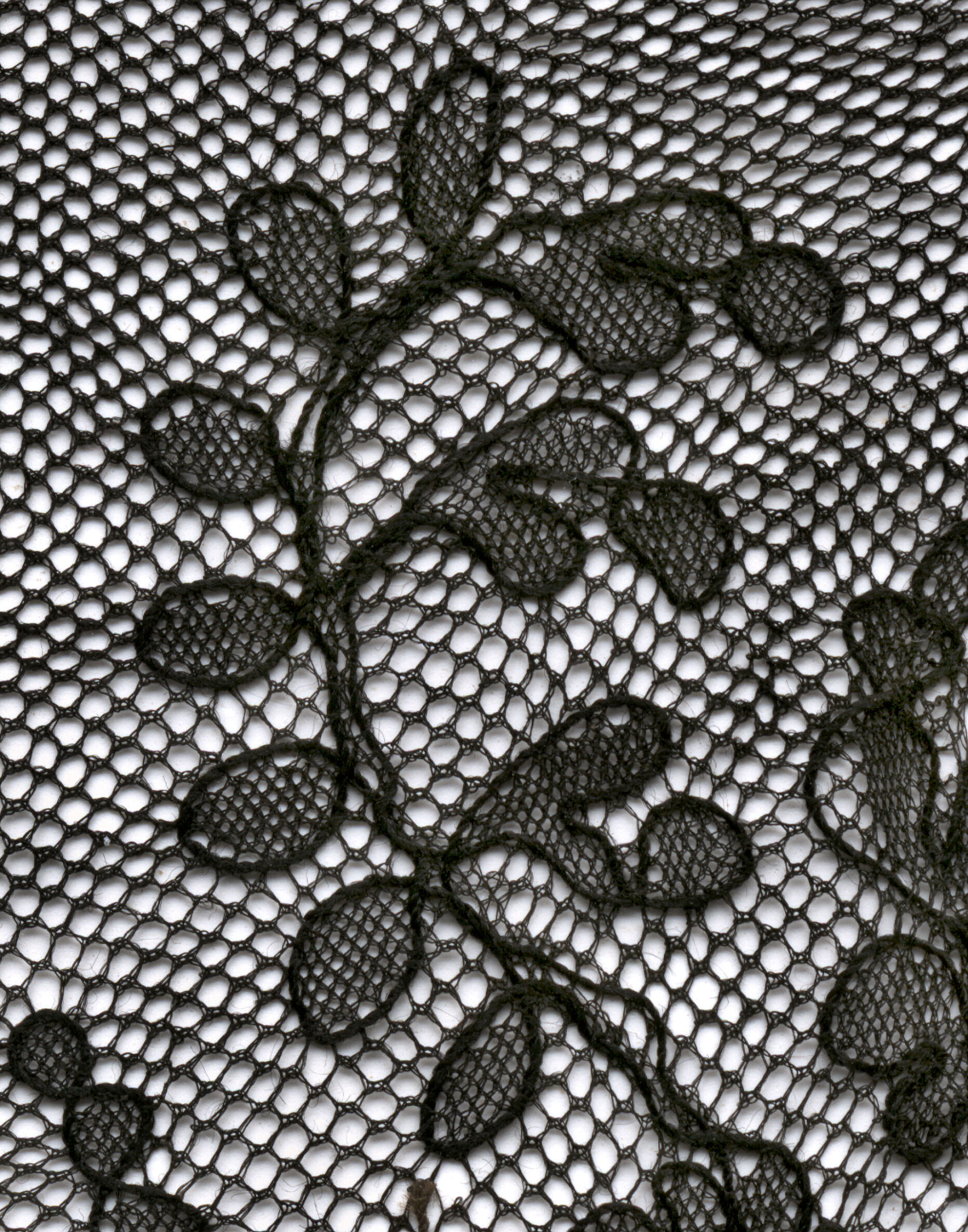
Machine made Chantilly lace with cordonnet

The term gimp with reference to lace refers to the thread that is used to outline the pattern. This thread is normally thicker than that used to make the lace. It gives definition and slightly raises the edge of the design. A gimp thread is used widely in many laces, with notable exceptions being Binche lace and Valenciennes lace.

The terms gimp and cordonnet can, for the most part, be used interchangeably, as both are defined as the thread that forms the outline of the design. The term "cordonnet" is used particularly when the outline is padded and when the thread is completely on the surface of the lace. When the thread is made of more than one strand (as in Chantilly lace), it is also called a cordonnet. In machine-made laces the outlining thread is always called a cordonnet.

== See also ==
- Scoubidou
