= Antwerp lace =

Type of bobbin lace from Antwerp, Belgium

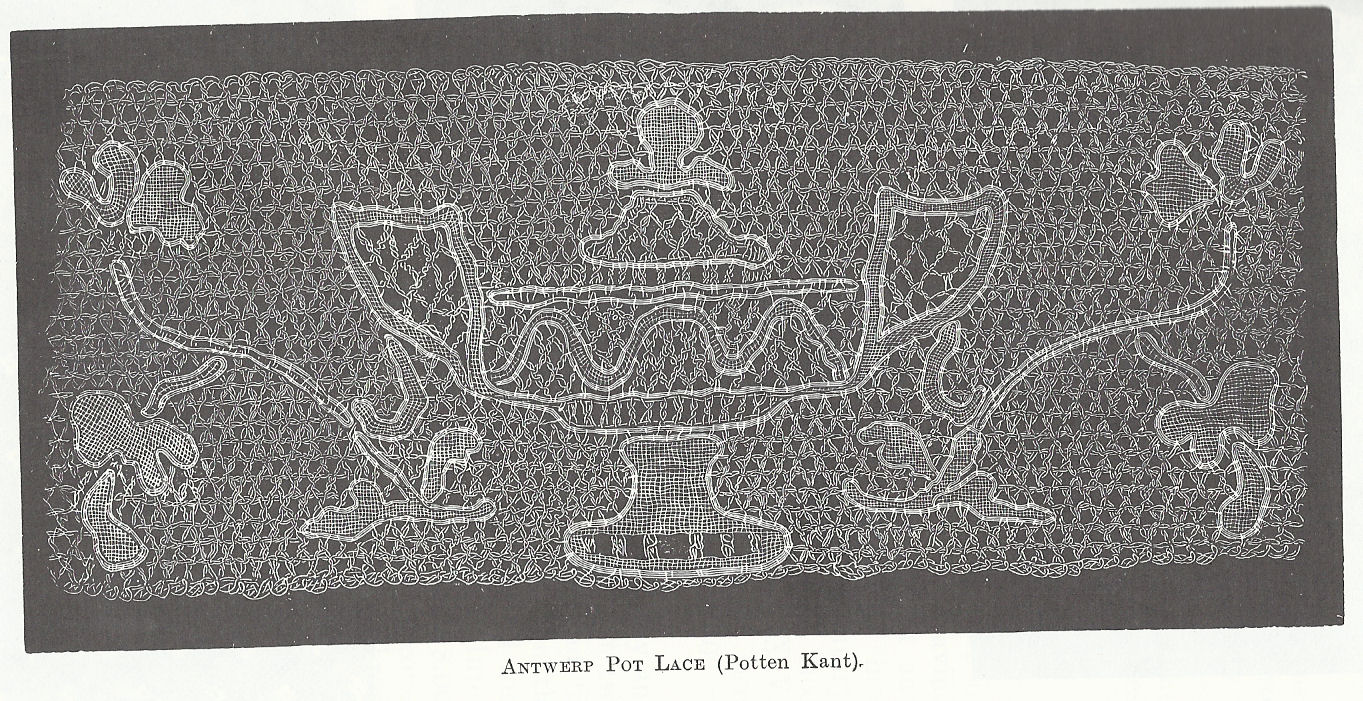
- Antwerp pot lace (Potten Kant)
- Type: Lace
- Production method: Bobbin lace
- Production process: Craft production
- Place of origin: Antwerp, Belgium
- Introduced: 16th century

Antwerp lace is a bobbin lace distinguished by stylized flower pot motifs on a six point star ground. It originated in Antwerp, where in the 17th century an estimated 50% of the population of Antwerp was involved in lace making. Antwerp lace is also known, from its familiar repeated motif, as Pot Lace— in Dutch Pottenkant or Potten Kant. It is sometimes said that the flowers were a depiction of the Annunciation lilies; however, the flowers were not limited to lilies.

It is a continuous lace, meaning that it was made in one piece on a lace pillow, using the same threads in the pattern as in the ground, or réseau. Antwerp lace is very similar to Mechlin lace, which was also made in Antwerp. Antwerp lace is heavier and sturdier than Mechlin lace. It has a cordonnet, or a flat thread outlining the pattern, just as Mechlin lace does. The cordonnet was very strong and rather coarse. Antwerp lace was also similar to Binche lace in its cordonnet. The réseau or ground for Antwerp lace varies from the same hexagonal ground as Mechlin lace to a tessellation-pattern featuring a six-pointed star.

== History ==
Antwerp lace was being made during the 16th century. When the Dutch closed the river Scheldt to shipping in 1585 due to Antwerp falling under Spanish control, the production of Antwerp lace halted. By 1698 Antwerp lace was known in England. It first became popular as an export to the Spanish Indies, however when that market died the lace survived in traditional dress among the peasants near Antwerp. It was used mainly for trimming their hats throughout the 18th and 19th century.
