= Chantilly lace =

Type of silken bobbin lace

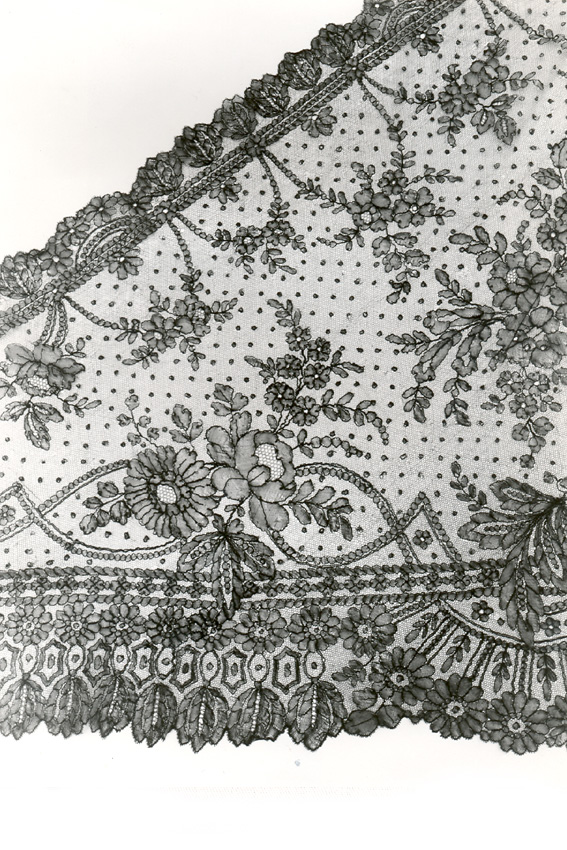
- Shawl in Chantilly lace - MoMu-collection, Antwerp (Detail)
- Type: Lace
- Production method: Bobbin lace
- Production process: Craft production
- Place of origin: Chantilly, France
- Introduced: 17th century

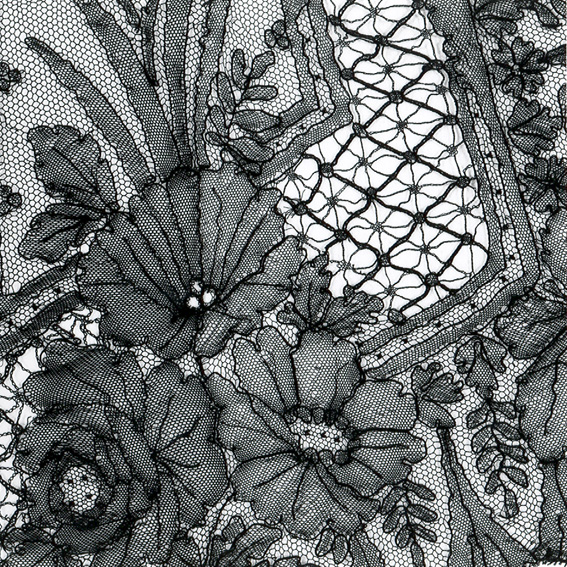
Scarf in Chantilly lace - MoMu-collection, Antwerp (Detail)

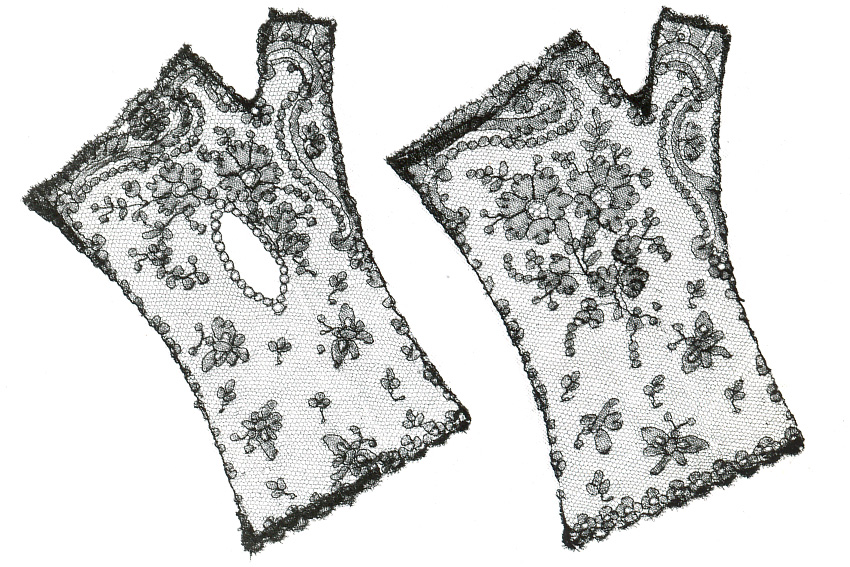
Mitts in Chantilly lace - MoMu-collection, Antwerp

Chantilly lace is a handmade bobbin lace named after the city of Chantilly, France, in a tradition dating from the 17th century. The famous silk laces were introduced in the 18th century. Chantilly lace, was also produced in the 19th century but this one was actually made not in Chantilly area but in the French Norman town Bayeux and in Geraardsbergen, now in Belgium.

Chantilly lace is known for its fine ground, outlined pattern, and abundant detail. The pattern is outlined in cordonnet, a flat untwisted strand. The best Chantilly laces were made of silk, and were generally black, which made them suitable for mourning wear. White Chantilly lace was also made, both in linen and silk, though most Chantilly laces were made of silk. The black silk Chantilly lace became especially popular, and there was a large market for it in Spain and the Americas. Chantilly and the Spanish laces (such as blonde lace) were the most popular black laces. Little white Chantilly was ever made. Another notable thing about Chantilly lace is the use of a half-and-whole stitch as a fill to achieve the effect of light and shadow in the pattern, which was generally of flowers. The background, or réseau, was in the form of a six pointed star, and was made of the same thread as the pattern, unlike the otherwise similar blonde lace. The lace was produced in strips approximately four inches wide, and then joined with a stitch that left no visible seam.

Chantilly lace remained popular in 19th century Europe, when many fashionable women wore black or white Chantilly shawls made in Brussels or Ghent.

== History ==
In the 17th century, the Duchesse de Longueville organised the manufacture of lace at Chantilly. It has been produced from then until the present day. It became popular because of the duchesse's patronage and Chantilly's proximity to Paris and came into fashion again during the reigns of Louis XV and Louis XVI; it was a special favorite of Louis XV's last mistress, Madame du Barry, and of Marie Antoinette. When the French Revolution began in 1789, demand for the lace ceased. The lace-makers were seen as protégés of the royals, and after Mme du Barry and Marie Antoinette were guillotined in 1793, the lace-makers of Chantilly were killed as well. At this point production ceased.

Napoleon I sponsored a revival of Chantilly lace between the years 1804 and 1815. At this time production was concentrated in Normandy, mainly around the Bayeux area. While it was no longer being made in Chantilly, all of the old techniques and designs were used. Chantilly lace reached the height of its popularity around 1830 and was revived again in the 1860s, at which point it was made at Bayeux as well as at Geraardsbergen, in what is nowadays Belgium.

In 1844, a machine was patented that made Valenciennes lace and black silk Chantilly lace that was difficult to distinguish from the handmade lace.
