= Valenciennes lace =

Type of bobbin lace from Valenciennes, France

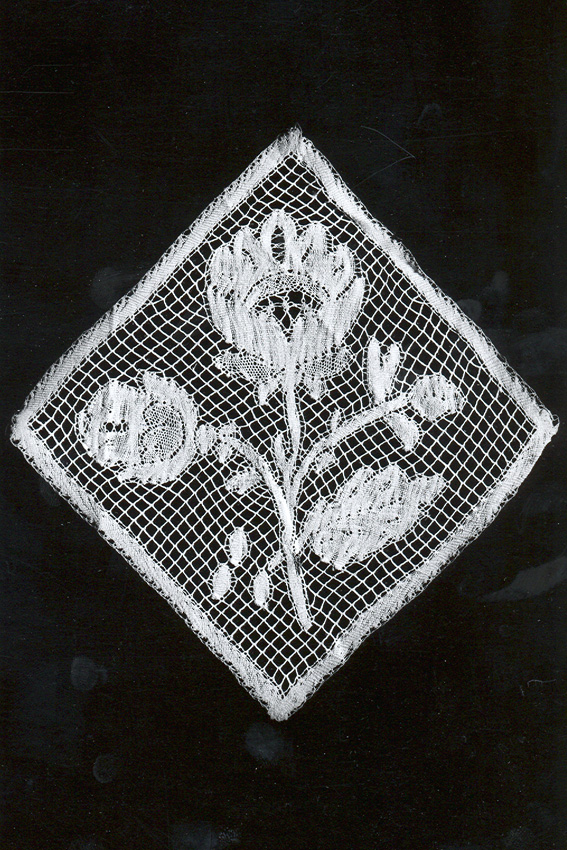
- Valenciennes bobbin lace (1850-1900), MoMu-collection, Antwerp
- Type: Lace
- Production method: Bobbin lace
- Production process: Craft production
- Place of origin: Valenciennes, France

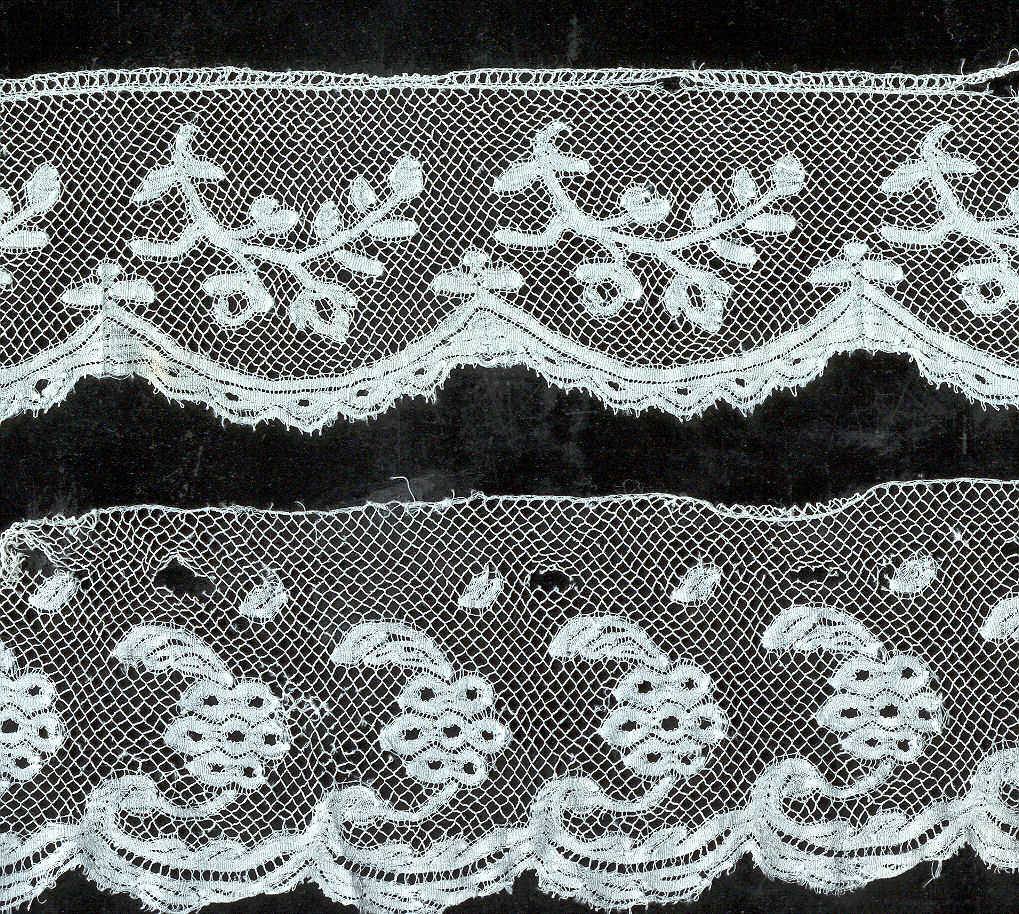
Private collection

Valenciennes lace is a type of bobbin lace that originated in Valenciennes, in the Nord département of France, and flourished from about 1705 to 1780. Production later moved to Belgium, in and around Ypres. The industry continued into the 19th century on a diminished scale. By the 19th century, Valenciennes lace could be made by machine.

Valenciennes lace is made on a lace pillow in one piece, with the réseau (the net-like ground) being made at the same time as the toilé (the pattern). It differentiates itself from other types of lace because the openness of the réseau, the closeness and evenness of the toilé, which resembles cambric, and that it lacks any cordonnet (a loosely spun silk cord used to outline and define the pattern). Also, in real Flemish Valenciennes lace there are no twisted sides to the mesh; all are closely plaited, and as a rule the shape of the mesh is diamond but without the openings.

The réseau ground is made of four threads braided together, with eight threads at the crosses, which makes it very strong and firm. This is simpler and easier to make than the ground for Mechlin lace, though similar in appearance.

Valenciennes lace received an impetus in the seventeenth century, when the Scheldt was channelled for river navigation between Cambrai and Valenciennes, benefiting the export of Valenciennes' wool, fabric and fine arts. To use up flax yarn, women began to make the famous Valenciennes lace. Early Valenciennes lace was grounded with fancy mesh which was thicker and closer than the open réseau used later. The more open version was developed in Valenciennes, and thus the type of lace became known under the name of the town. The open mesh started to evolve in the 18th century and by the 19th century the characteristic ground made of four braided threads was in use. By the 1900s little of the famous lace was still made in Valenciennes.
