= Craft production =

Factory where products are hand-made

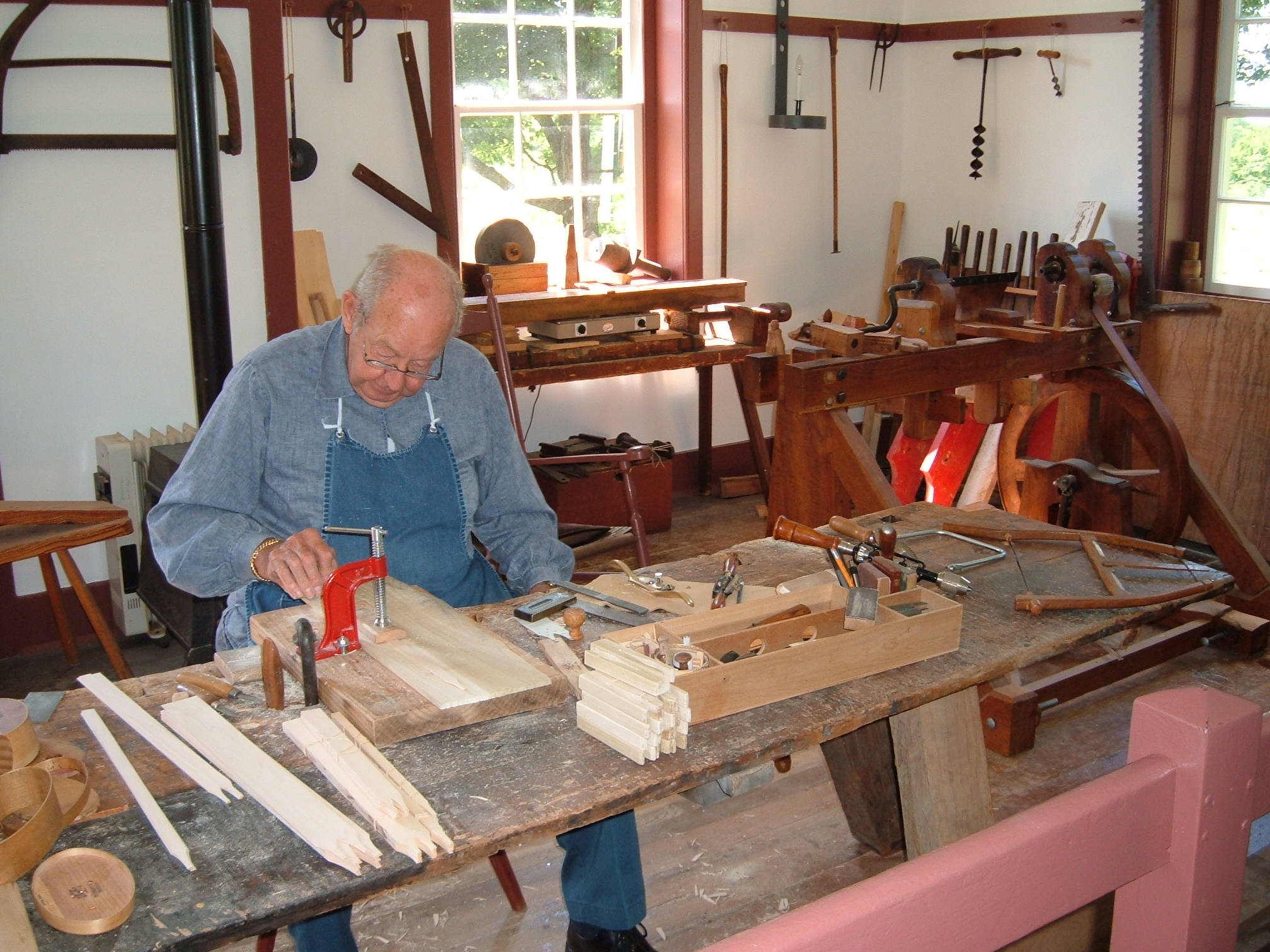
A craftsman making boxes in the manner of the 19th-century Shakers

Craft production is a mode of manufacturing based on skilled labor, flexible techniques, and low-volume, customized output, often using hand tools, simple machinery, or no tools at all. It was the dominant production system before the rise of industrial mass production. In the history of manufacturing, craft production is often treated as the earliest major stage in a sequence that later includes mass production and lean manufacturing.

== Craft production at the community scale ==
Craft production is a part of the informal economy in many cities, such as Istanbul, Turkey where the informal craft economy is a vital source of income for the Turkish craftspeople. Craft markets are highly dependent on social interactions, and verbal training which results in variations in the goods produced. Often, the craft economy consists of craft neighbourhoods, by which a community is structured on the craft activity present in the area.

Often used in the household, many craft goods such as historic Mumun Pottery in Korea, originated from the need for economic alternatives to meet household needs. Changes in the craft economies have often coincided with changes in household organization, and social transformations, as in Korea in the Early to Middle Mumun Period.

Given that craft production requires an intimate knowledge of methods of production from an experienced individual of that craft, the connection between trades people is highly evident in craft communities. The production of many crafts has a high technical demand, and therefore require full-time specialization of the skill-set in the form of workshops, or verbal, hands-on training. The verbal interaction between teacher and student encourages strong social bonds, which ultimately leads to cohesive communities, typical of modern day craft communities.

=== Craft economies and location ===
Craft economies are highly related to place. Craft-specialization explores how portable goods are integral to the social relations of a community, and links groups of people together through the creation of tangible items.

Places where craft economic activity is taking place indicate strong linkages between sociopolitical organization and societal complexity. These communities are often tight-knit, with strong linkages to materials produced and sold, as well as mutual respect for fellow tradesmen in the market place.
