= Ipswich lace =

Bobbin lace from Ipswich, Massachusetts

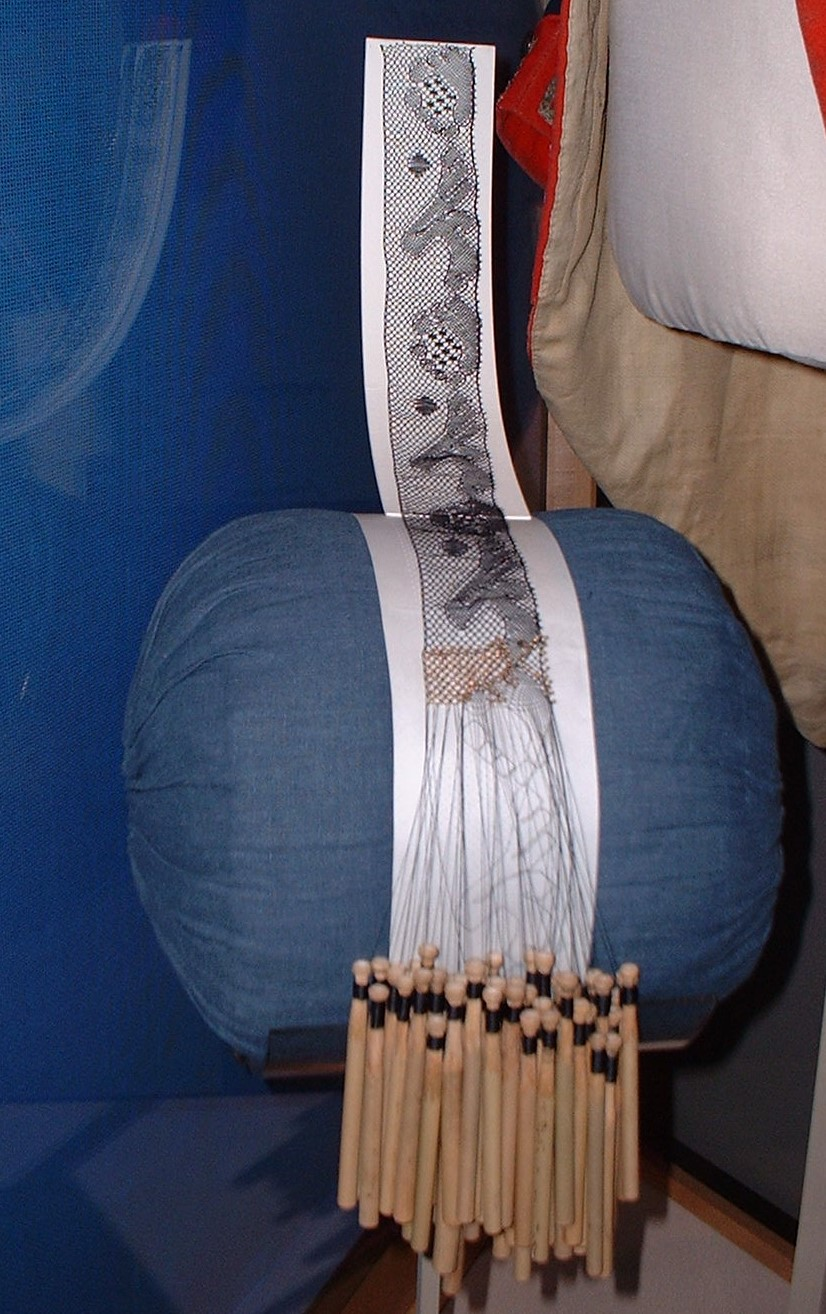
- Ipswich lace display in the Smithsonian
- Type: Lace
- Material: Silk, linen
- Production method: Bobbin lace
- Production process: Craft production
- Place of origin: Ipswich, United States
- Introduced: 18th century

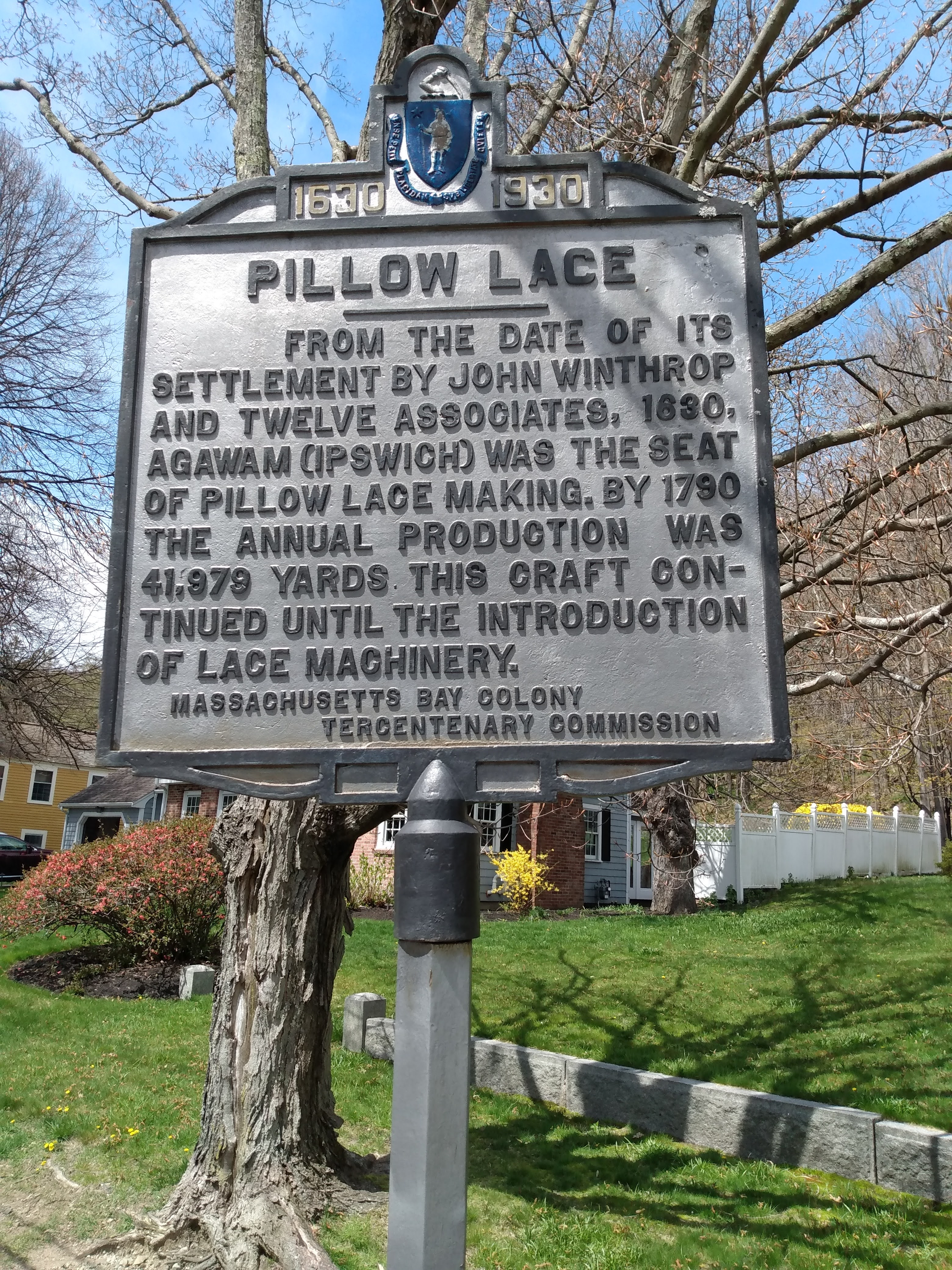
Historical marker acknowledging the production of bobbin lace in Ipswich.

Ipswich lace is a historical fashion accessory, the only known American hand-made bobbin lace to be commercially produced. Centered in the coastal town of Ipswich, Massachusetts north of Boston, a community of lacemaking arose in the 18th century. Puritan settlers to the area likely made and wore lace as early as 1634, because Sumptuary laws from the early colonial records indicate this activity. A drawn thread lace embroidery in the Peabody Essex Museum survives from the earliest colonists, the work of Anne Gower Endicott. The earliest known record of the act of bobbin lacemaking in the region comes from a court case in 1654 associated with the home of Governor John Endicott. An indentured servant in the household accused the governor's son Zerubbabel with assault, which occurred while she was working at her lace cushion. Earliest known records of the commercial production indicate that lace produced by local women was used to barter for goods in the 1760s, as denoted by ledger account books belonging to local merchants. These laces were sold in the region from Boston to Maine.

Although some references presume that Ipswich lace represents an offshoot of the styles of British laces such as that known today as Bucks point lace, and originated with English immigration, other evidence points to continental influence. Bucks point is theorized to have developed from Mechlin, Lille, and other lace styles brought to England with Huguenot refugees. Early Buckinghamshire region lace may be different from the characteristics of this lace in modern understanding. A key observation is that the footside of Ipswich lace sits to the left during production, contrary to English laces typically created with a footside to the right.

Ipswich bobbin lace is similar to European bobbin laces of the 18th century such as Mechlin and Valenciennes, but developed characteristics and patterns of its own over the production period. They were made as borders and insertions to be added to clothing or household items. It is a continuous lace, meaning that the threads continue from the beginning to the end of the pattern, as opposed to non-continuous laces, where the threads that are used for the motifs (dense, decorative parts) are not the same threads as those used to make the fillings and grounds (the open parts connecting the motifs). The motifs in Ipswich lace are mostly surrounded with a thick gimp (outline) thread. Most of the motifs are constructed with the half stitch (Cross-Twist), and the ground of small meshes connecting the motifs consists of either some variation on the Torchon ground or the Kat-stitch, also called Paris ground. A decorative edge of two-threaded picots (loops) are very common. The Point ground (cross, twist, twist, twist) as used in Bucks point and other similar laces were not used as a ground in the Ipswich laces, only as a decorative filling.

== History ==
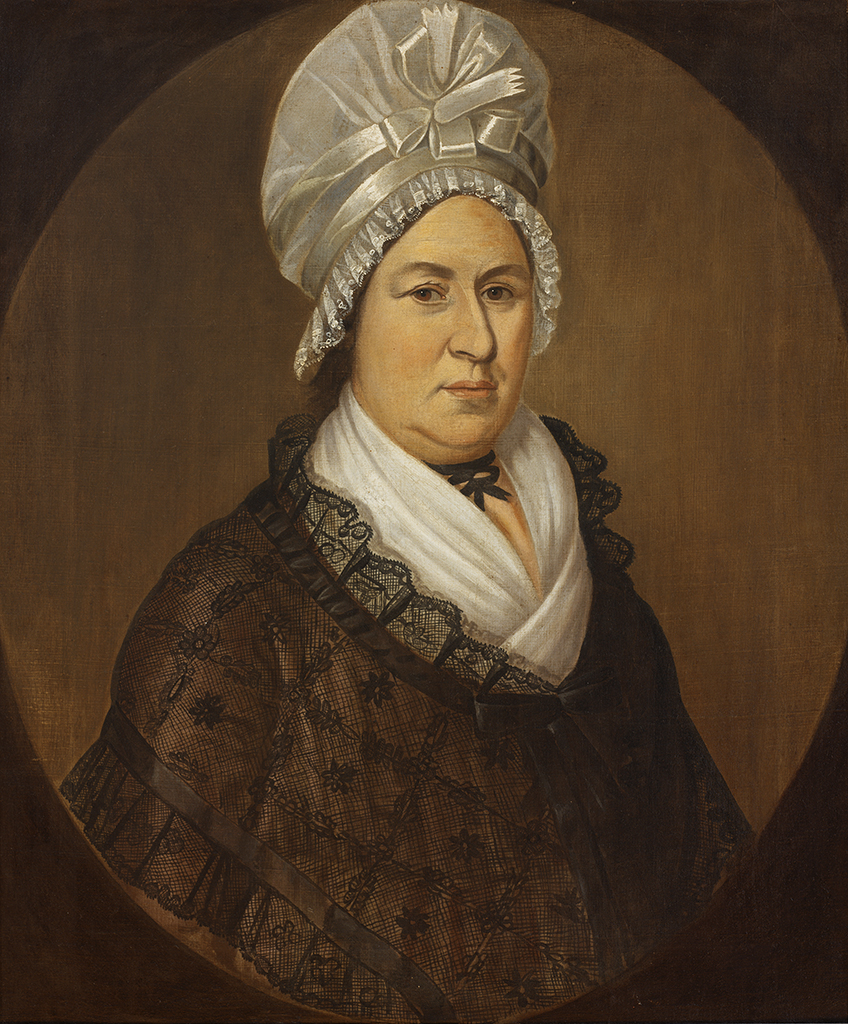
William Jennys - Portrait of Mrs. Israel Ashley - 2002.97.4 - Rhode Island School of Design Museum

Typically the lace was produced from "prickings" or patterns created on parchment or pasteboard that were attached to a round bolster-style lace pillow. Bobbins whittled from local wood or reeds were used to provide the thread repository and the appropriate tension for constructing the lace. Linen or silk thread was the material commonly used in the early period with cotton employed only later after the development of mercerised cotton improved thread characteristics. Imported and individually handmade pins provided the structural support for the patterns, until pin-making machines became available in the 1840s. Known lace examples are largely white linen or black silk threads.

Preceding and during the American Revolutionary War, the purchase of luxury imported goods was problematic from social, political, and logistical perspectives. Hannah Adams of Medfield, who later became an eminent writer, described making bobbin lace herself during these years. The style or type of lace she made is unknown, but confirms that lace making was underway and profitable during this period in Massachusetts.

During the American revolutionary war, I learned to weave bobbin lace, which was then saleable, and much more profitable to me than spinning, sewing or knitting, which had previously been my employment. At this period I found but little time for literary pursuits. But at the termination of the American war, this resource failed, and I was again left in a destitute situation.

By the 1790s, over 600 women in the Ipswich area were producing significant quantities of lace for sale. Stored in the Library of Congress with the papers of Alexander Hamilton, a report of this activity was submitted to the Secretary of the Treasury with actual samples of Ipswich lace. Reverend Joseph Dana, author of the report, provided:

A Return of Lace and Edging, manufactured in the Town of Ipswich, from August 1789 to August 1790. With the value of the whole, computed from the Bartering-Prices at which the different parcels of each have been sold.

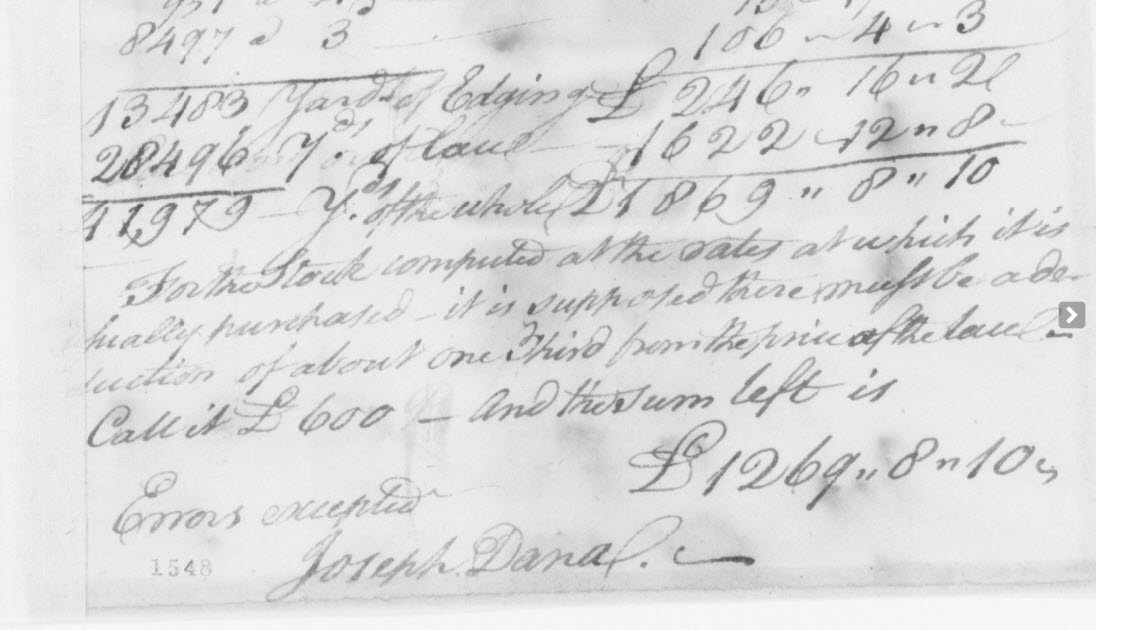
Dana Report of Ipswich Lace Production

Rev. Dana reported 13483 yards of edgings and 28496 yards of lace, for a total of 41979 yards of Ipswich lace made by local women in that time frame.

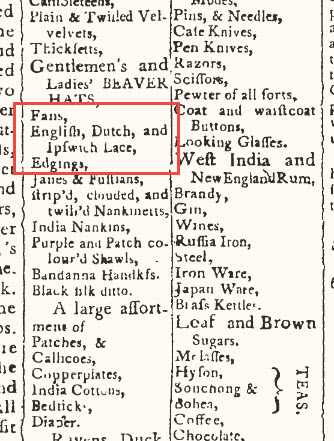
Section of a shopkeeper's advertisement from Newburyport MA in 1797, highlighting Ipswich lace. Courtesy of the Newburyport Public Library

Lace making continued through the end of the century and into the early 1800s as a hand-made activity, and period advertisements for “American Laces” and “Ipswich Lace” indicate that the lace was available from local merchants, on par with competing European laces. Period paintings in the New England region frequently illustrate black lace shawls with trims that resemble Ipswich laces. However, these garments may have been too fragile to survive the centuries and are difficult to locate in archives. Black lace was subject to decay due to "acidic mordant" that made them fragile.

Extant samples of Ipswich lace on garments can be found in various archives. For example, a mourning cap, silk hood and a cloak featuring Ipswich lace are found in the Museum of Fine Arts, Boston. Martha Washington possessed a shawl made with Ipswich lace which is preserved in the Mount Vernon collection; the lace was reportedly purchased by George Washington on his post-election tour of the young United States. An additional lace segment is also at Mount Vernon. Lace adorning a man's Masonic "Memento mori" apron is also an Ipswich lace. The Museum of Old Newbury at The Cushing House has a boy's garment, called the Eleazer Johnson dress, which appears to have rare blond Ipswich lace collar and cuff trims. A "dressed miniature" of Sarah Hamlin Sage by Mary Way (or her sister Betsy) is adorned with a shawl that appears to be a previously unknown Ipswich lace pattern. The lace has characteristics of typical Ipswich motifs, and represents a non-garment based use of the lace in an art piece which is novel. The Ipswich Historical Society and Ipswich Museum have conserved artifacts of the lace-making activities. Historic New England displays an Ipswich pillow with bobbins and lace in progress on a pricking.

In the 1820s, attempts to mechanize lace production in Ipswich shifted activity away from hand made pillow laces to embroidery on lace bobbinet that was produced by machine. Although some lace makers continued to produce pillow lace, and samples of Ipswich lace were cherished and stored by traditional lace makers like Sarah Lakeman, hand-made lace making was no longer a widespread commercial practice.

In the 1970s, a lace restorer and self-taught lace maker named Michael Auclair replicated the black Ipswich lace samples from the Library of Congress archives. By the 21st century, revived interest in this historical lace was supported by new scholarship and exhibition. In 2001, an exhibit in The Smithsonian National Museum of American History called Within These Walls displayed a historic house relocated from Ipswich and included reproduction Ipswich lace and lacemaking tools. In addition, archived lace samples that are stored in the Library of Congress have been re-created by Karen Thompson, and pattern working diagrams have been published that enable lace makers to accurately reproduce this lace today.

Ipswich lace has also appeared in popular culture. A trilogy of fiction books by Brunonia Barry uses Ipswich lace as a plot device, and a major character is a maker of the lace in one of the books, The Lace Reader. In the book, the lace is used as the source of psychic vision activation.

The New England Lace Group has initiated a project to raise the profile of Ipswich lace and the historical lace makers of this region. A mobile exhibit of Ipswich lace history and tools, and reproduction laces, has been developed to educate and inform at local historic sites and craft fairs. Media coverage included discussion of the history of this textile and its cultural significance in the region.

== Gallery ==
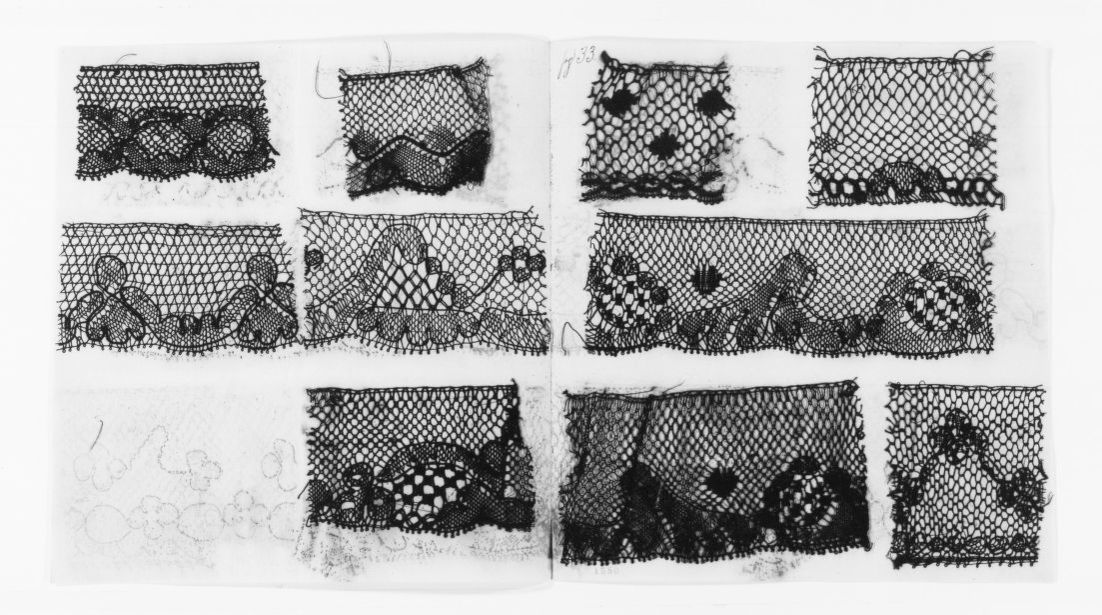
Samples of black silk Ipswich lace from Joseph Dana's report

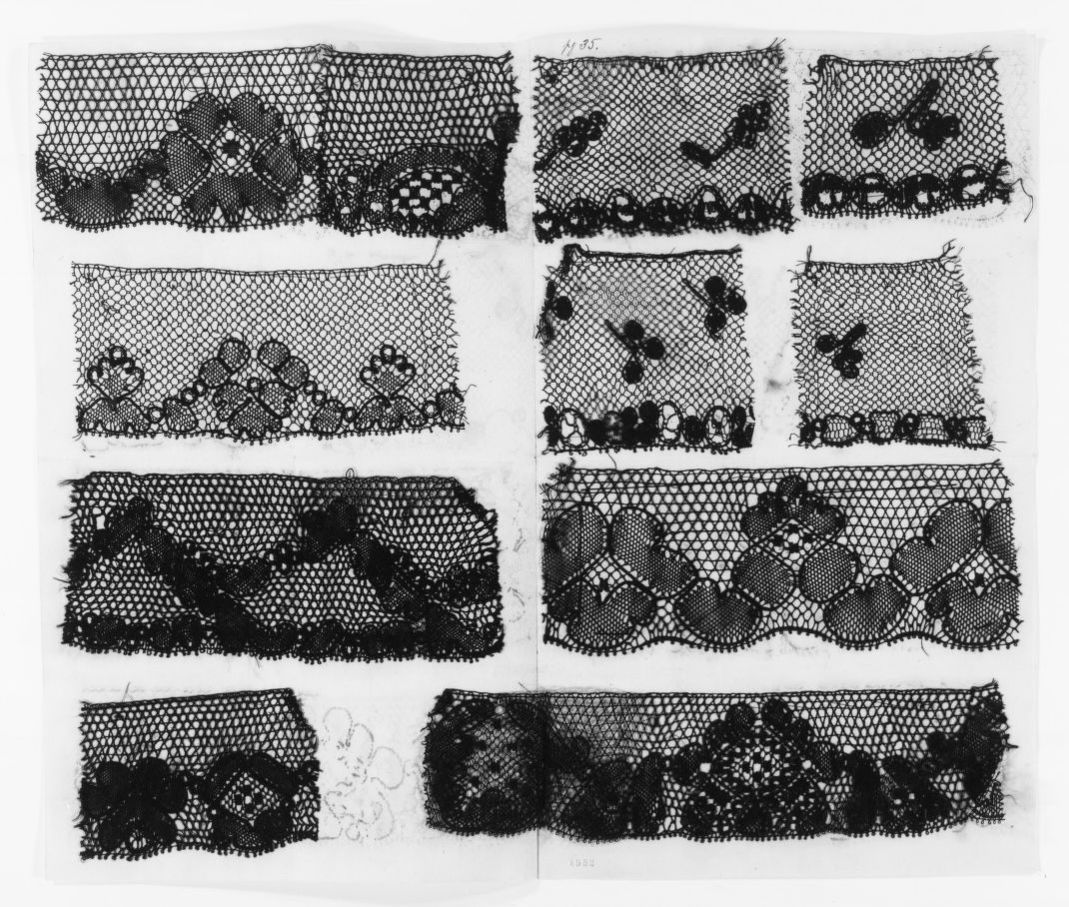
Samples of black silk Ipswich lace from Joseph Dana's report

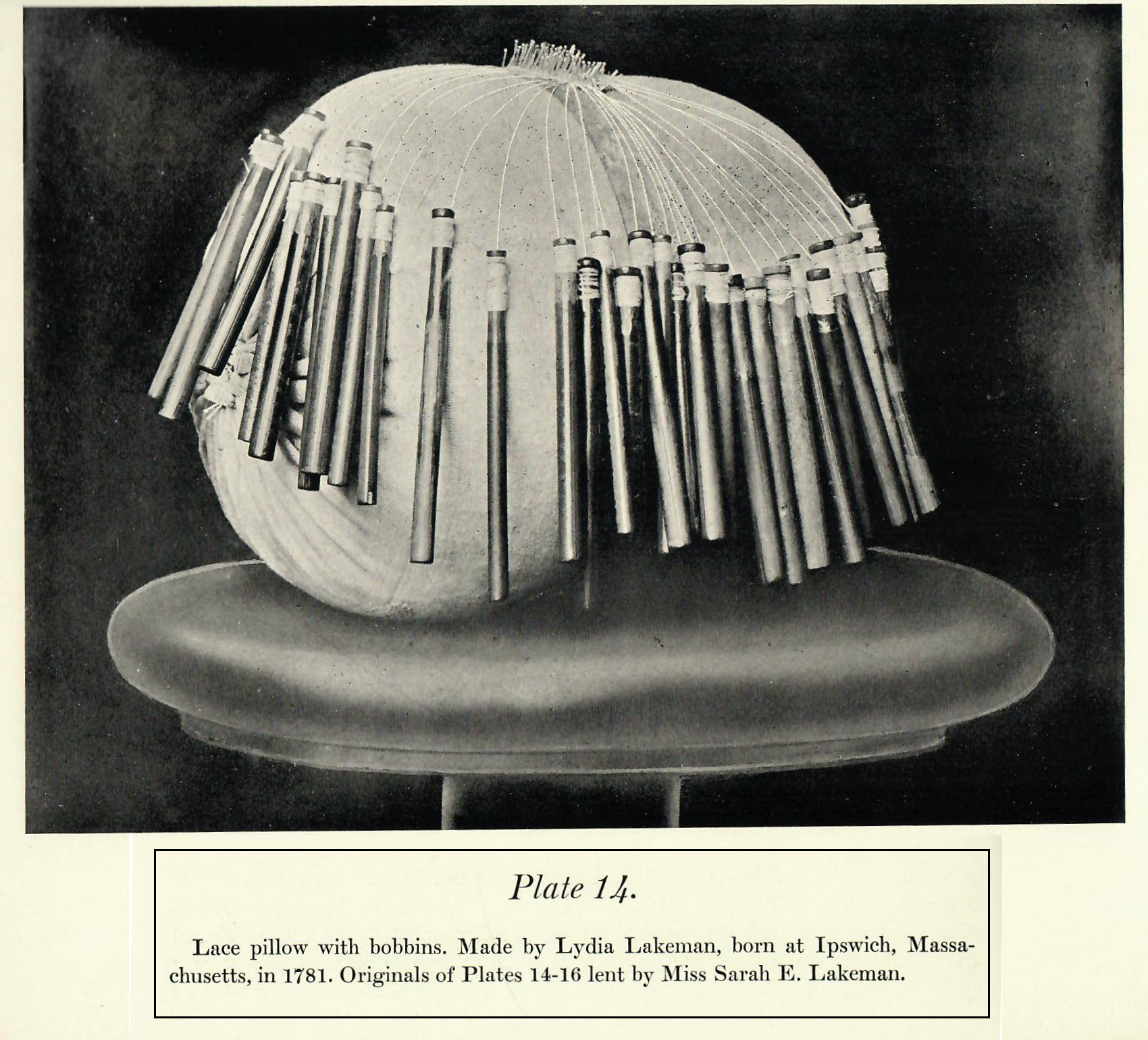
Ipswich lace pillow with bobbins

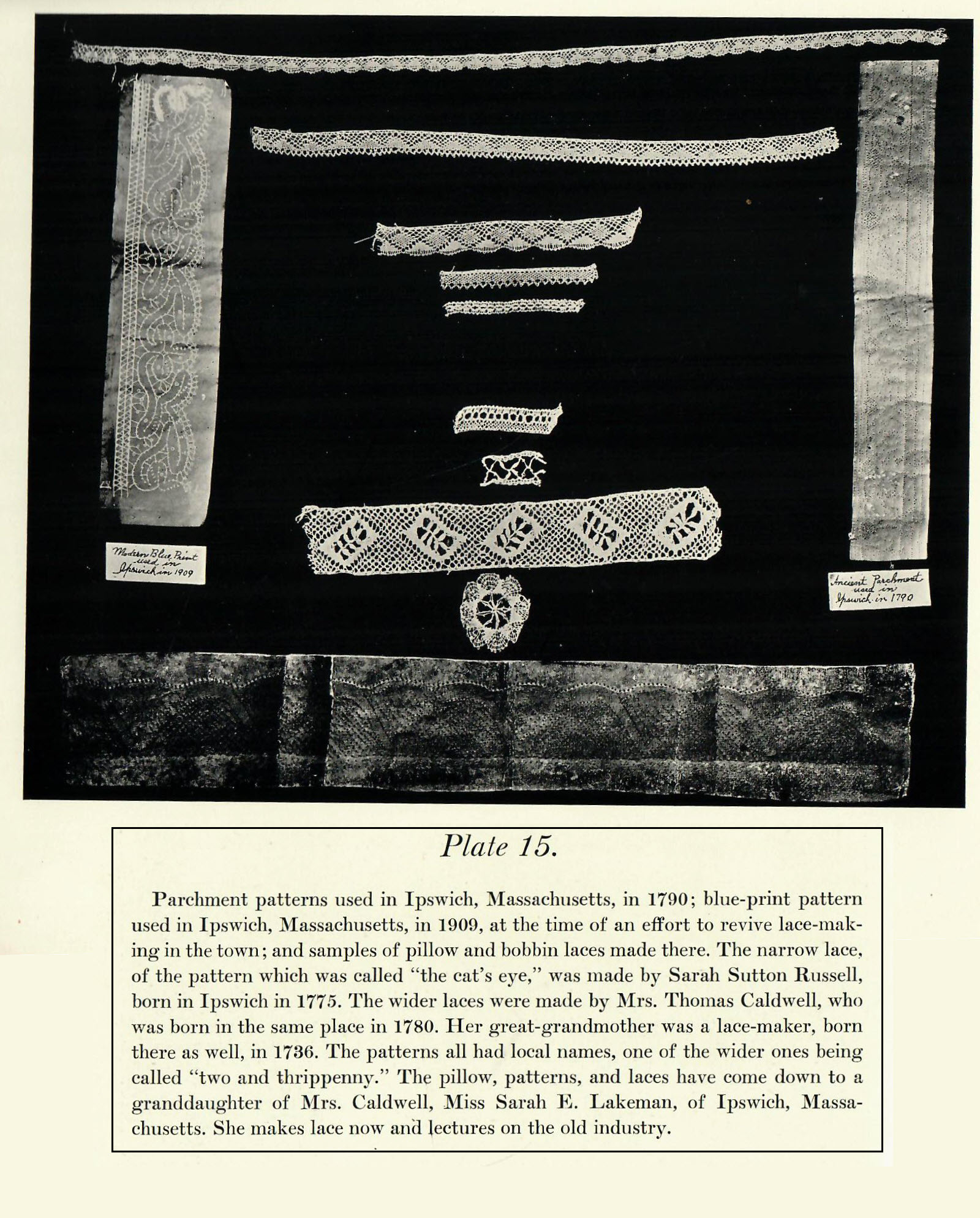
Parchment patterns for Ipswich lace, and samples of lace

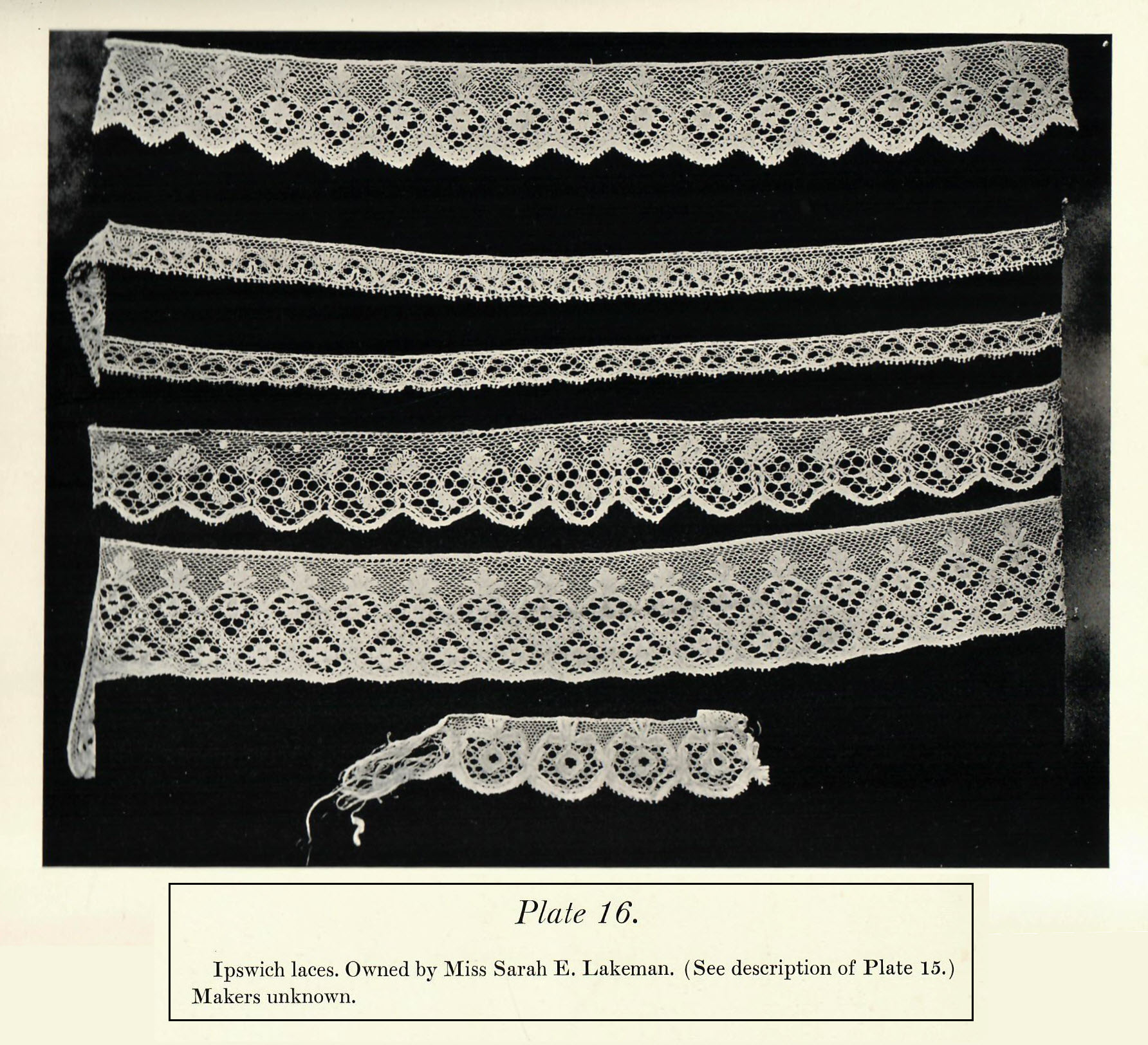
Ipswich lace samples, made with white thread

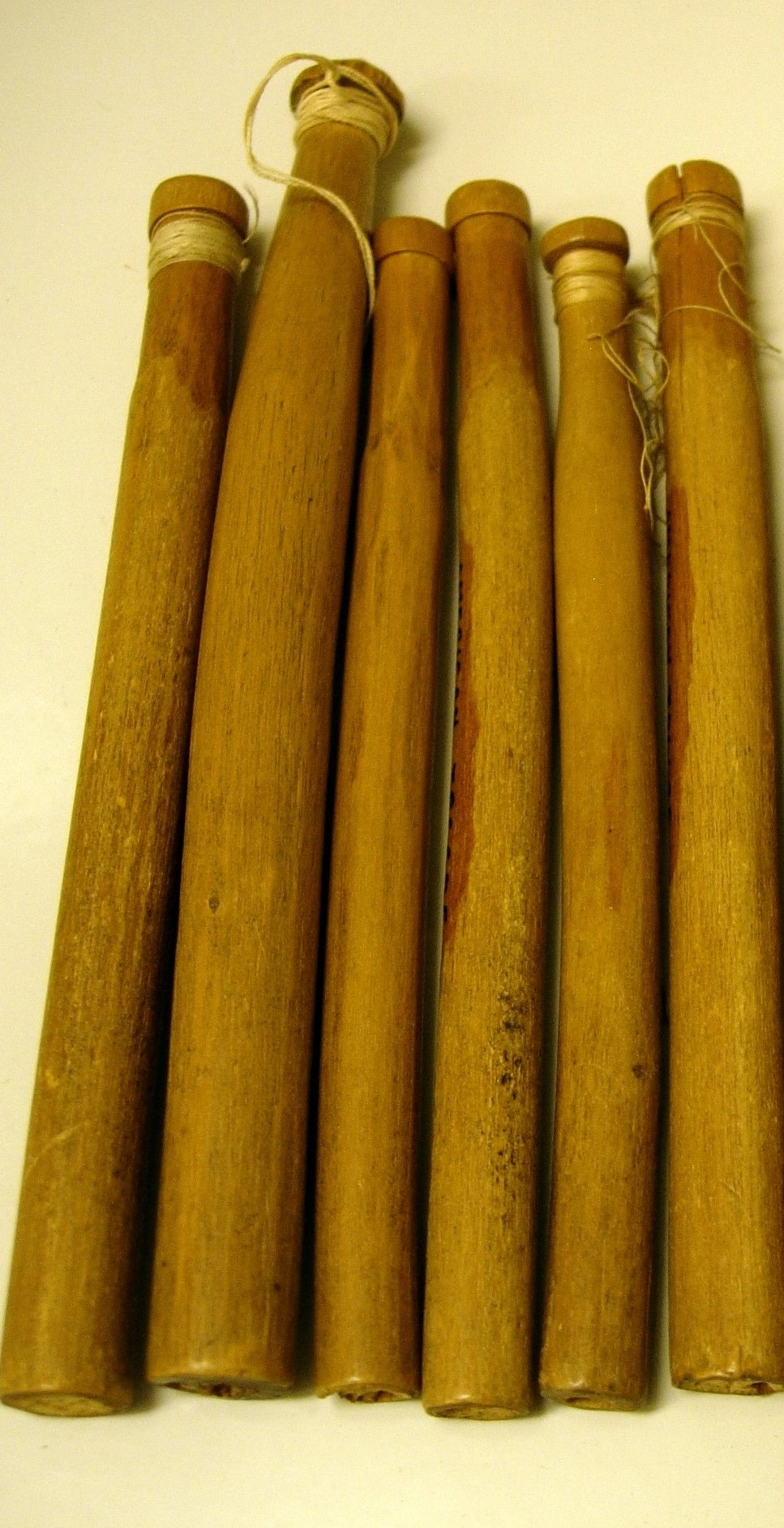
Ipswich bobbin lace bobbins whittled from bamboo or wood

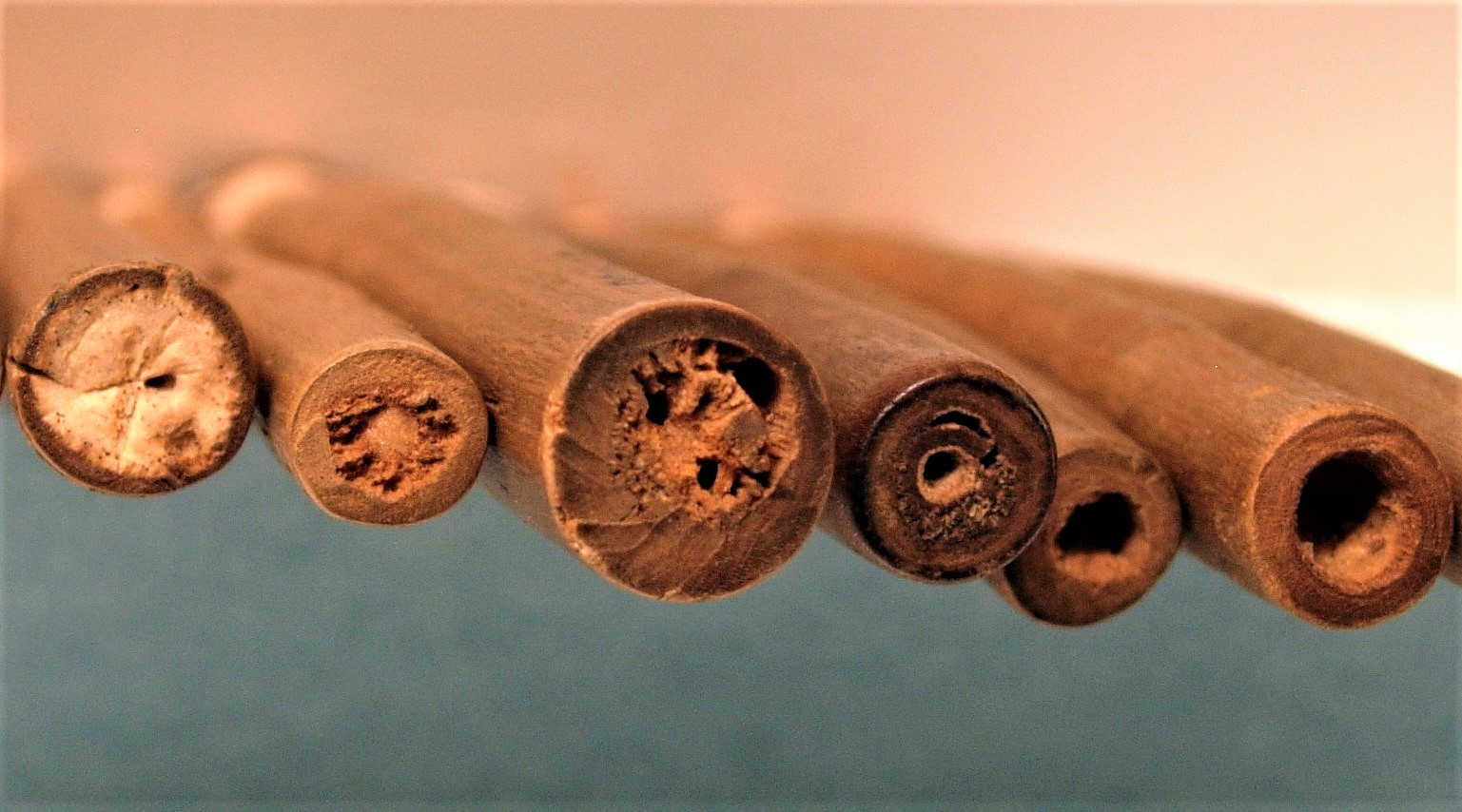
The ends of Ipswich bobbins show the hollow stems

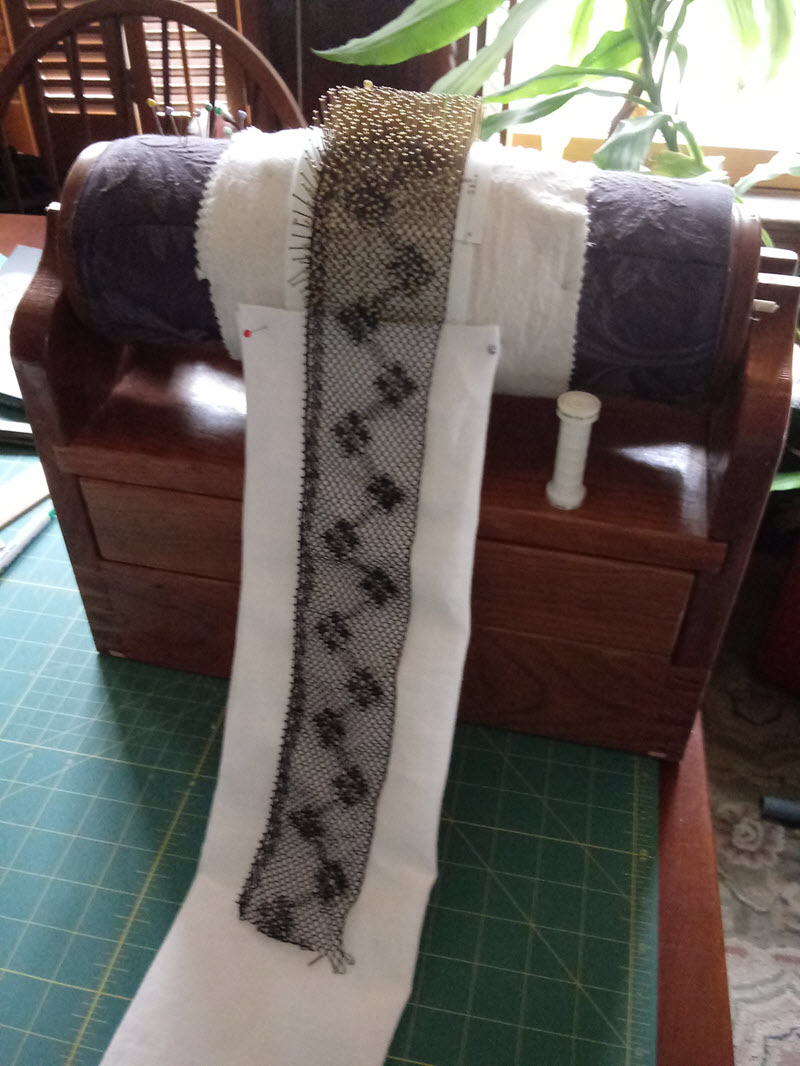
Reproduction Ipswich lace made with historical pattern
