= Blonde lace =

Silken bobbin lace from France

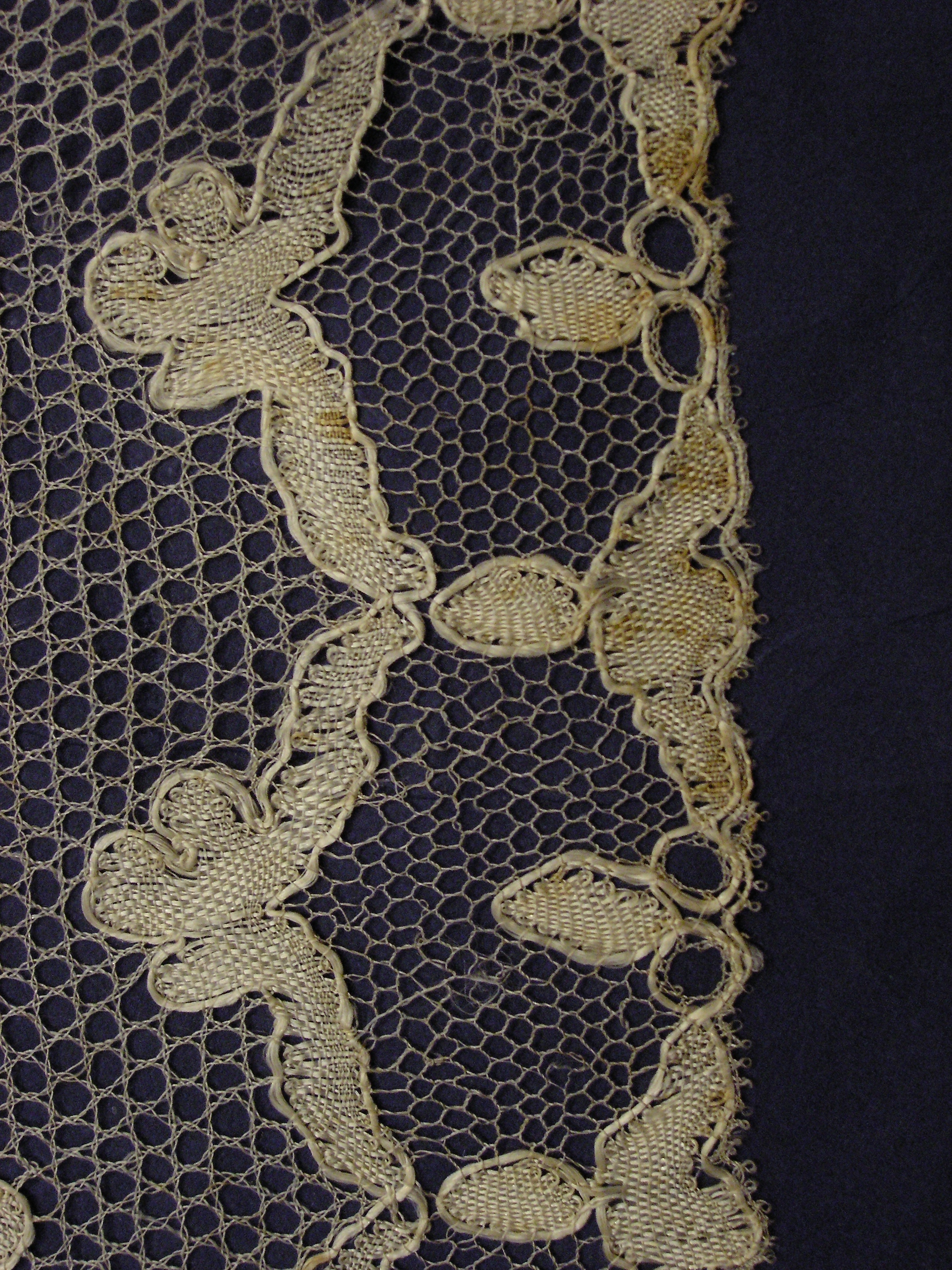
This fichu is an example of blonde strapwork technique

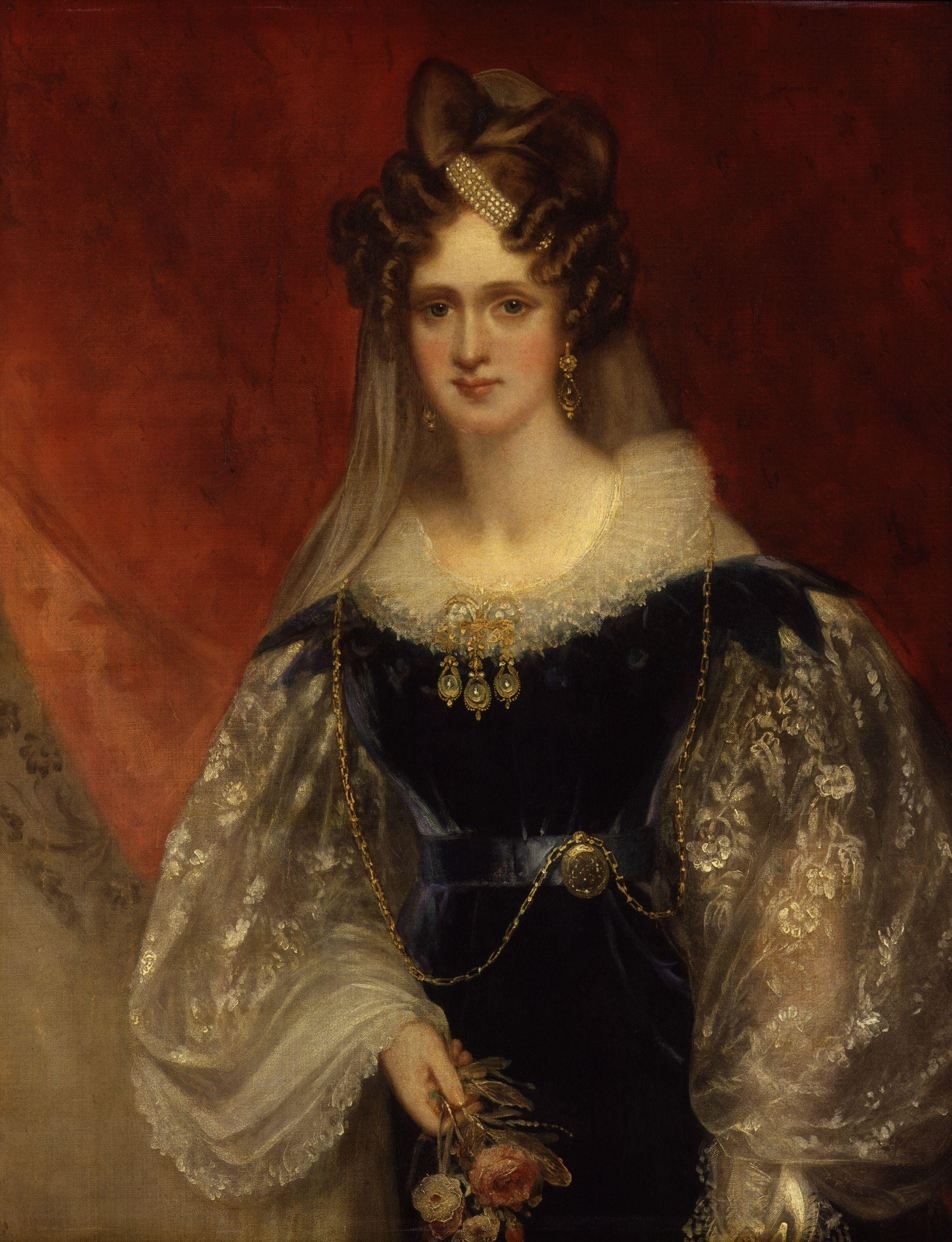
Queen Adelaide wearing blonde lace, c. 1830

Blonde lace is a continuous bobbin lace from France that is made of silk. The term blonde refers to the natural color of the silk thread. Originally this lace was made with the natural-colored silk, and later in black. It was made in the 18th and 19th centuries. The pattern, which is generally of flowers, is made with a soft silk thread, thicker than the thread used for the ground. This causes a big contrast between the flowers and the ground. It uses the same stitches as Chantilly lace and Lille lace, and is similarly made in strips 5 in (13 cm) wide and invisibly joined.

Blonde lace became very popular, and replaced Mechlin lace. It is very soft, and thus was well suited to the gathered trimmings fashionable during the nineteenth century. Blonde lace was used by royalty, and was worn in the portraits of the daughter of George IV, Princess Charlotte in 1817, and of Queen Adelaide in 1830. In 1805 blonde lace was popular in Paris.

Blonde lace was made in Caen from 1744, in parts of Flanders, in Barcelona, and, in small quantities, in the east Midlands of England from about 1806. It did not suffer when other lacemakers were reduced to the brink of ruin in 1821 to 1832 by the introduction of machine-made bobbin net. In fact, the demand for blonde actually increased, and Caen exported great quantities, by smuggling, to England. It was one of the earliest laces to be copied by machine - in 1833 the traverse warp machine (invented in 1811) made it for a full season, and it was sold without saying it was machine-made, at handmade prices, with no one the wiser. By 1840 blonde lace was out of favor.

== Spanish blonde lace ==
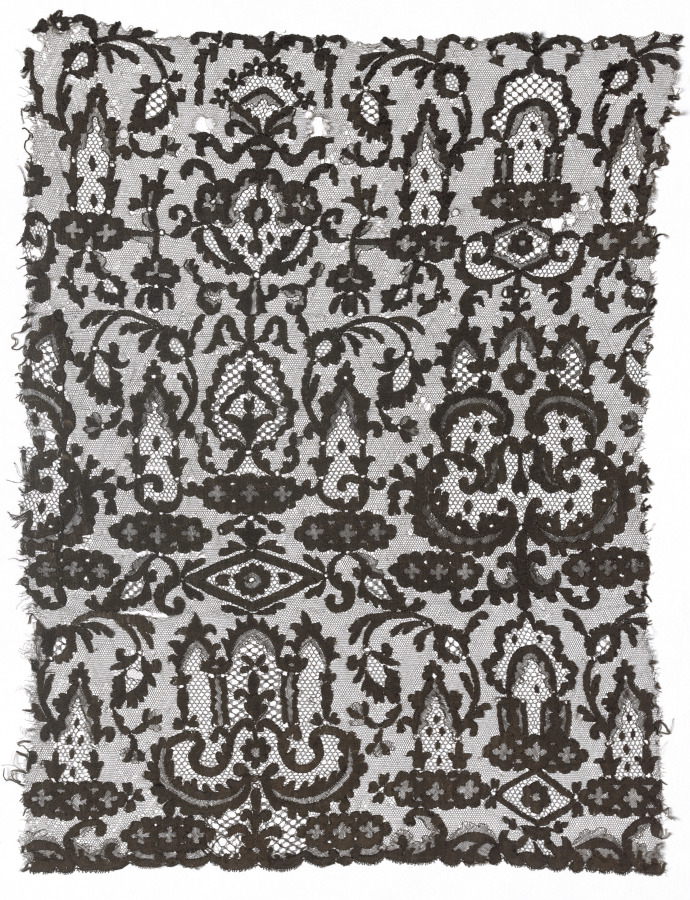
Blonde lace from Spain, early 19th century

There was a lot of blonde lace made in Spain, mostly in the Catalonia region, and especially in Barcelona. It had all the same qualities as blonde lace made elsewhere, with very large flowers. It was used mainly for mantillas and scarves and became part of the archetypical image of a Spanish lady.
