= Brussels lace =

Type of bobbin lace from Brussels

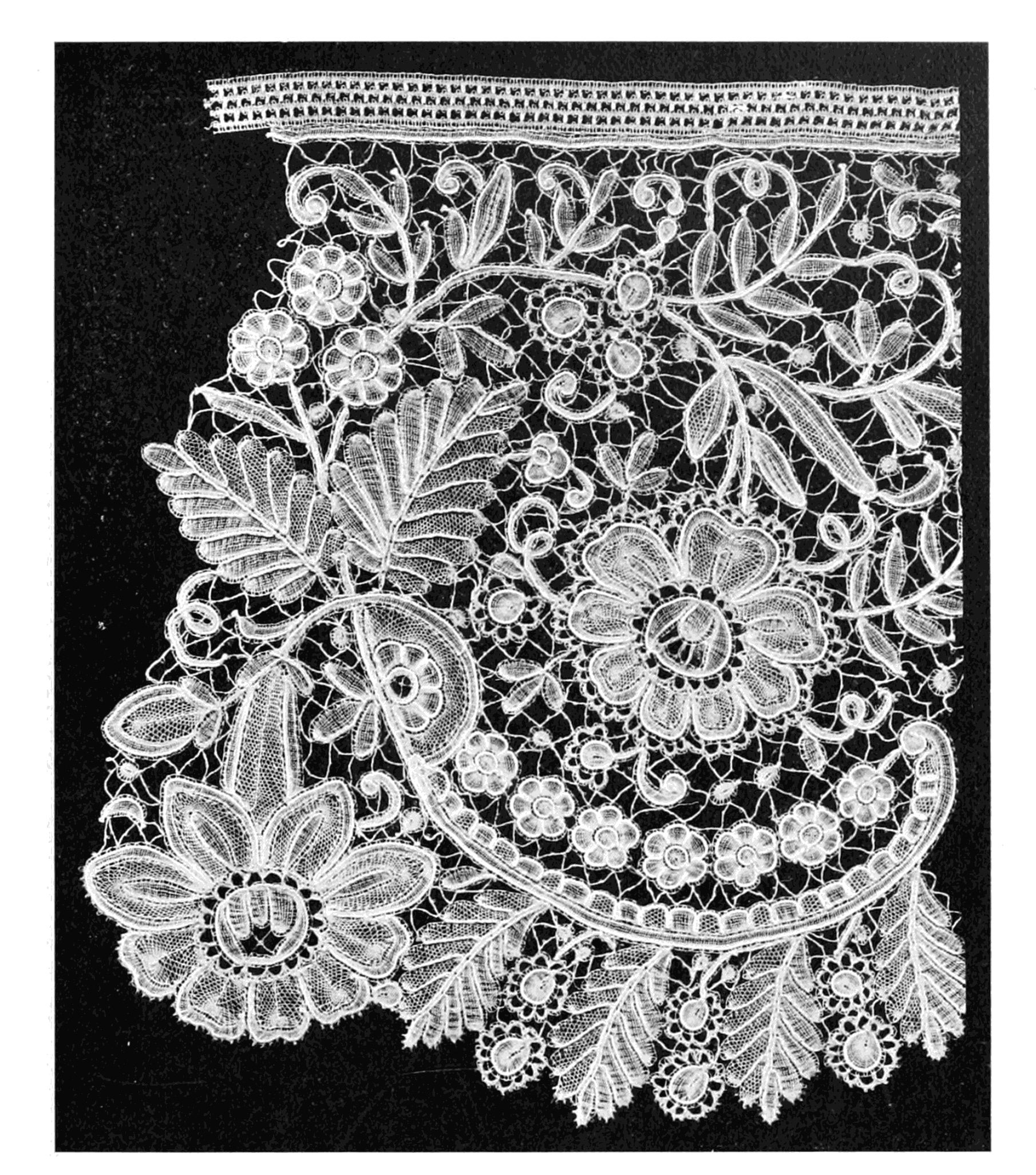
- Duchesse, 19th, detail
- Type: Lace
- Material: Linen
- Production method: Bobbin lace
- Production process: Craft production
- Place of origin: Brussels, Belgium
- Introduced: 15th century

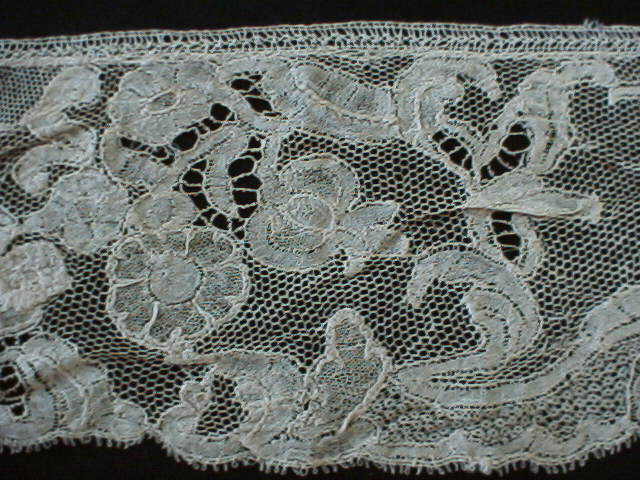
Point d'Angleterre, 18th

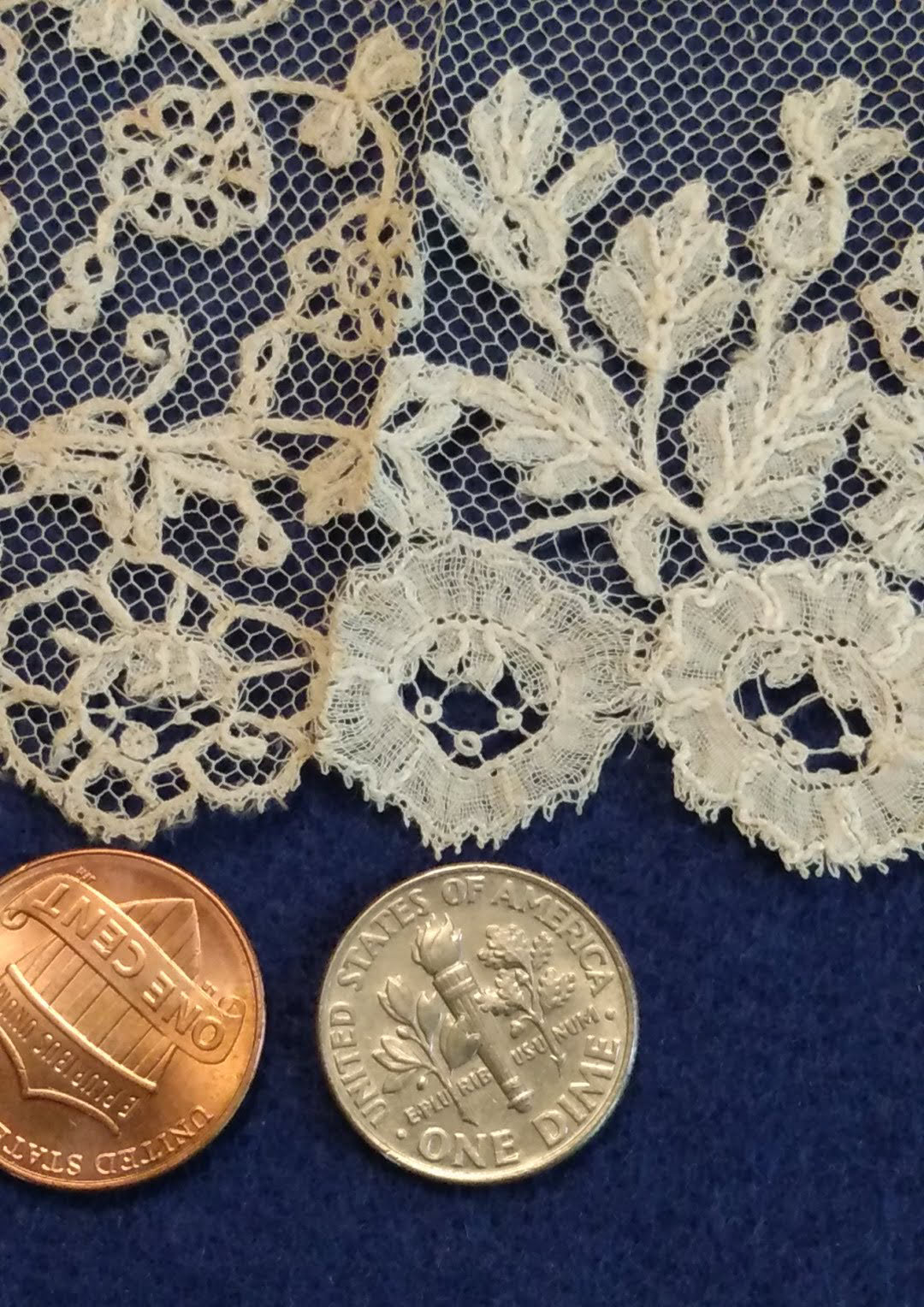
A section of Brussels bobbin lace appliqued on a hexagonal mesh

Brussels lace is a type of pillow lace that originated in and around Brussels. The term "Brussels lace" has been broadly used for any lace from Brussels; however, strictly interpreted, the term refers to bobbin lace, in which the pattern is made first, and the ground, or réseau added, also using bobbin lace. Brussels lace is not to be confused with Brussels point (or Point de Gaze), which is a type of needle lace, though sometimes also called "Brussels lace".

Brussels lace is well known for its delicacy and beauty. Originally it was only made from the finest spun linen thread, which was spun in dark damp rooms to keep the thread from becoming too brittle. Only one ray of light was allowed into the room, and it was arranged so that it fell upon the thread. This fine thread was one reason preventing mechanization of the process of making Brussels lace, as well as the production of it in other regions, as it could not be bought anywhere else. It was also what made the lace so costly. Brussels lace cost more than Mechlin lace, and was in high demand in England and France.

Brussels lace started to be produced in the 15th century, and was first explicitly mentioned in England in a list of presents given to Princess Mary for New Years 1543.

== Production ==
Brussels lace is part lace. This is made in pieces, with the flowers and design made separate from the ground, unlike Mechlin lace or Valenciennes lace; because of this, the long threads that form the design always follow the curves of the pattern, whereas in bobbin laces made all at the same time, the threads are parallel to the length of the lace. Brussels lace is also distinguished by its réseau or background, the toilé or pattern, and the lack of a cordonnet outlining the pattern. The réseau is hexagonal, with four threads plaited four times on two sides, and two threads twisted twice on the remaining four sides. The toilé can be of two types, the standard woven texture like a piece of fabric, or a more open version with more of the appearance of a netted réseau. This allows for shading in the designs, an effect that was used more in later designs. In Brussels lace, instead of a cordonnet, the pattern is edged with open stitches, which are then picked up to form the réseau. The first step was to spin the flax thread, which was then given to the lace-makers who made the pattern, which was generally of flowers. Then the lace-makers would make the réseau, hooking onto the open edge of the pattern, and working around the pattern to fill the ground.

== Point d'Angleterre ==
In 1662, the English Parliament passed an act prohibiting the import of all foreign lace as there was considerable alarm at how much money was being spent on foreign lace, and the protection of English lace manufacturers took precedence. However, English lace merchants could not supply lace of the same quality as the Brussels lace, and Flemish lace-makers were reluctant to settle in England. England also produced inferior flax and thus could not spin the fine thread required, and so the lace produced was of an inferior quality. Since the merchants could not produce the lace at home, they resorted to smuggling and named the smuggled Brussels lace 'Point d'Angleterre', "English point."

France also had regulations forbidding the importation of foreign lace, so the Brussels lace sold in France was also sold as 'Point d'Angleterre'. To this day, all Brussels lace is called Point d'Angleterre in France. Ladies of the court of Louis XV greatly favored this lace.

When the English prohibition ended in 1699, Brussels lace gained popularity once more. Queen Anne bought a lot of it, despite the high price. In the courts of George I and George II, the lace became very popular, despite efforts to encourage native lace-making. It was used on ruffles, lappets, and flounces. Individual pieces were large and made of many one-inch to two and a half-inch pieces, sewn together seamlessly. This type of lace was made until the French Revolution.

== Point plat appliqué ==
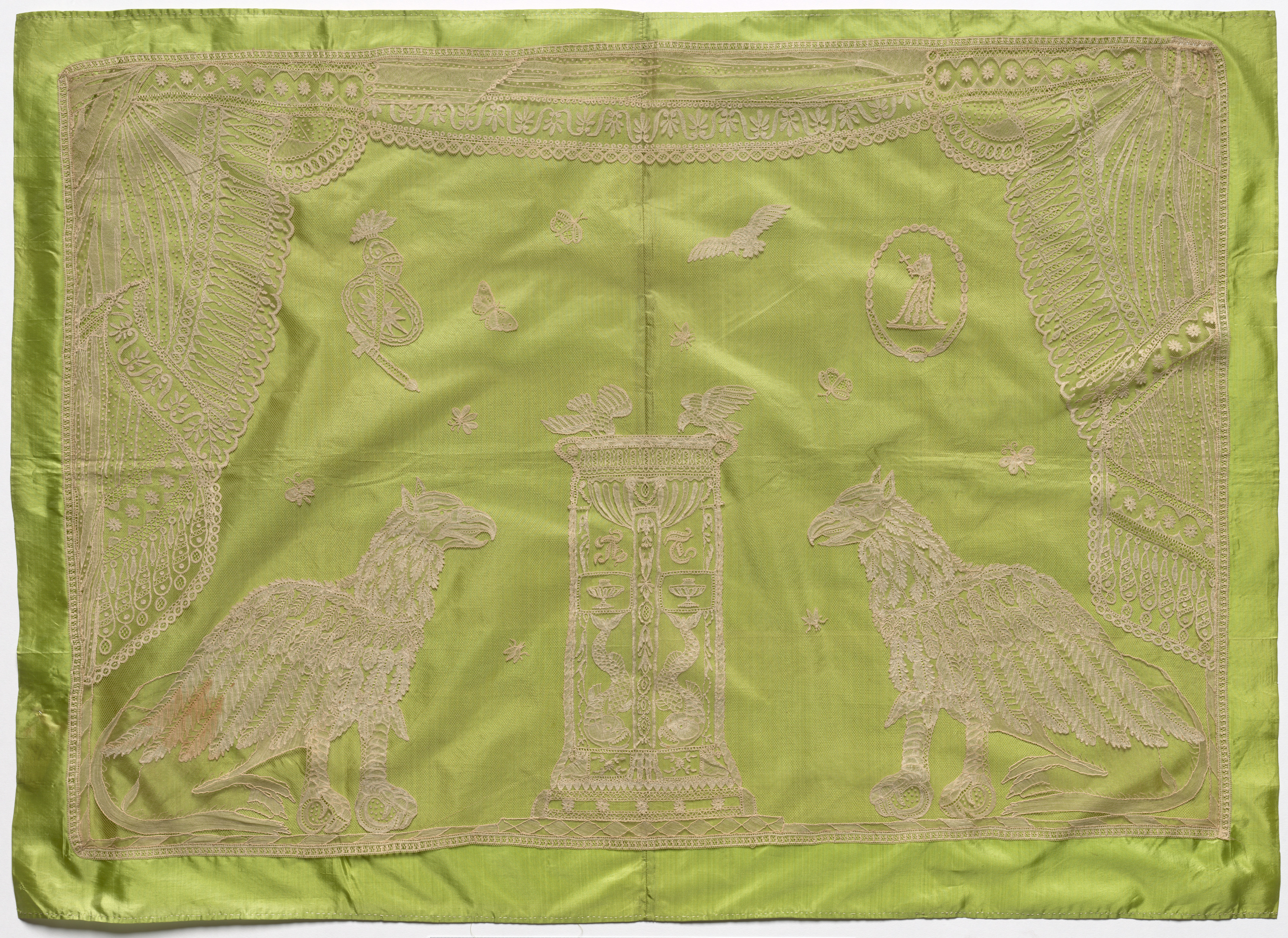
Unknown artist - Bobbin (Point Plat Appliqué), Machine, and Needlepoint Lace Panel - 1923.977 - Cleveland Museum of Art

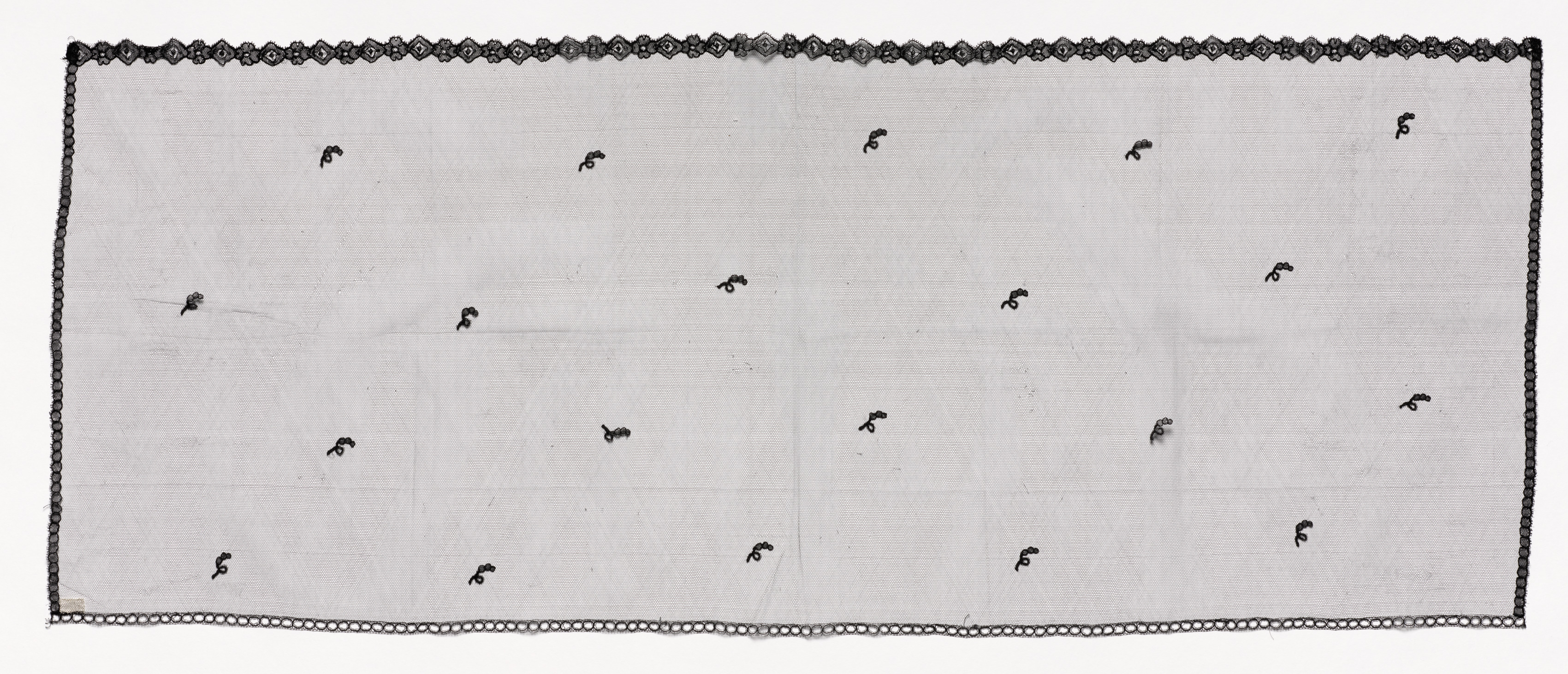
Black Point Plat Appliqué bobbin lace on machine lace net

Point plat appliqué ("Applied flat point") is the term given to Brussels lace where the design is appliqued to machine net, instead of using handmade réseau. In 1810, in Nottingham, a machine that made extremely regular linen netting was perfected, and machine-made net became common. From this point on, the handmade réseau was only made upon request, and the designs were appliqued directly onto the machine-made net. This resulted in the designs becoming more spread out and less connected.

This type can be distinguished from handmade net, as often the net is not cut away behind the appliqued design; thus, the net can be seen on the back of the design. Also, the machine-made net was made of diamond-shaped mesh, rather than the hexagonal réseau.

== Point Duchesse ==
Point Duchesse ("Duchess point") is the term for a Belgian lace that does not have a réseau. It was named after the Duchess of Brabant, Marie Henriette of Austria who was a supporter of the lace production. It is made entirely on the pillow; the pattern is made so that the leaves and flowers naturally join and there is rarely a bar thrown across to connect them. As there is no réseau, the designs are more continuous.

== Modern Brussels laces ==
There is still an existing production of Brussels lace made by hand in Belgium. This production is getting smaller and smaller as the workers get older.

Two types of laces are still produced:

Renaissance lace is a needle work using a machine made tape. Even if the designs are not as intricate as the antique laces such as "Point de Rose" or "Duchess lace", it remains intricate and still demands many hours of work. This lace was developed in the early 20th century, but became famous some years later. This work is strong and easy to wash. It can be adapted to be washed by machine.

Princess lace is also a form of needle work. It is an application on a netting. Machine-made nettings have been used since 1850 in the production of this type of lace. These first nettings were produced in the hope it could save time so that lacemakers could be able to finish work faster. In the early 20th century, the machine-made netting that could be produced was of a different quality, more regular, and produced in larger quantities. The production of Princess lace started at that time, but it was only after World War II that this lace really became famous. It is the last handmade lace work that is still fine enough to be used for wedding veil and christening gowns. As these two types of laces are made using a machine (for the tape or the netting), some purists do not believe these techniques should receive the 'Handmade Belgian lace' tag. Discussions are still ongoing about this in lace-making circles. However most people agree that these two modern lace making techniques require a great deal of skill and handwork (80%) to be realized.
