= The Lace Reader =

2006 novel by Brunonia Barry

- First edition
- Author: Brunonia Barry
- Language: English
- Genre: Fiction, Novel
- Publisher: Flap Jacket Press
- Publication date: 2006
- Publication place: United States
- Media type: Print
- ISBN: 9780979159305

The Lace Reader (2006) is a novel by Brunonia Barry. The novel is set in Salem, Massachusetts, the American town famous for the Salem witch trials. A crucial plot device is the Ipswich lace that the protagonist's family would make.

The novel came to be well known for its unusual route to mainstream publishing. Originally self-published by the author it became a local success story, got rave reviews in many places including Publishers Weekly, and was eventually picked up by the US branch of HarperCollins in a multimillion-dollar deal.

It soon became a New York Times bestseller.

When asked about her inspiration for the book, Barry said, as reported on her blog:

For quite some time, I have been fascinated by the Hero’s Journey or the monomyth. Most stories that follow this pattern have a decidedly male orientation: a lone individual acts heroically and saves the day. I wondered if there might be an alternate form, a feminine Hero’s Journey. So I began to look at stories that featured female protagonists to see if they offered something different. What I found surprised me. Most of these women were either killed off or were ultimately rescued from their plight by male heros. Unsatisfied, I wondered if I could write a Hero’s Journey for women where the strong but wounded heroine must find a way to save herself.
