= Mary Way =

19th-century American artist

- Born: 1769; New London, Connecticut
- Died: November 1833 (aged 63–64)
- Education: Unknown; likely a Connecticut "female academy"
- Known for: "Dressed" portrait miniatures

Mary Way (1769 – November 1833) was an American painter, known for her portrait miniatures. She, along with her sister Elizabeth Way Champlain, was among the first women to work as a professional artist in the United States.

== Background ==
Portrait miniatures were popular in the colonial period and early Republic for about a century, from 1750 to 1850. John Singleton Copley was one of the more prominent American painters to produce miniatures.

The genre's historical roots extend back to medieval illuminated manuscripts, in which small-scale, detailed artistry was of paramount importance; and the portrait medal, popular in ancient times and the Renaissance, which Johnson describes as the "first small portable likeness[]".

The medium in which Way primarily worked—watercolor on ivory—was first developed by Rosalba Carriera, a 17th-century Italian miniaturist. As might be expected, miniature painting in this technique was immensely difficult. The small size alone presented formidable challenges. Moreover, ivory does not retain paint well, which meant that "the tiniest error was usually irreversible".

== Life ==
Way began her artistic career in New London, Connecticut, where she was born. Her father Ebenezer was a merchant; her mother Mary (née Tabor) died relatively early in Way's life. Her cousin Charles Holt ran a local newspaper in which he advertised Way's work. Her sister Elizabeth ("Betsey") Champlain (1771–1825) and niece Eliza Champlain (1797–1825) also worked in miniatures.

Although this has not been documented, many scholars note that it is likely Way learned painting at a "female academy" in Connecticut. (An 1833 obituary claims, however, that Way was "self-taught".) Huber suggests that this academy was the Lucy Carew School in Norwich, which taught needlework among other subjects. Female academies in early America taught literacy and numeracy, but as their students "were being schooled to be homemakers and matrons in a polite society", academies focused on the arts to the exclusion of more advanced academic subjects.

In 1809, Way herself had established a school for women in New London, in which she taught painting and other subjects. She had advertised as a teacher as early as 1796.

In 1811, she moved to New York City after her work had begun to attract notice. Despite gaining some recognition, she was poor for much of her life.

Way was forced to abandon her painting career in 1818 when she became blind from glaucoma. Around that time, she left New York for New London to be with her family.

== Art ==
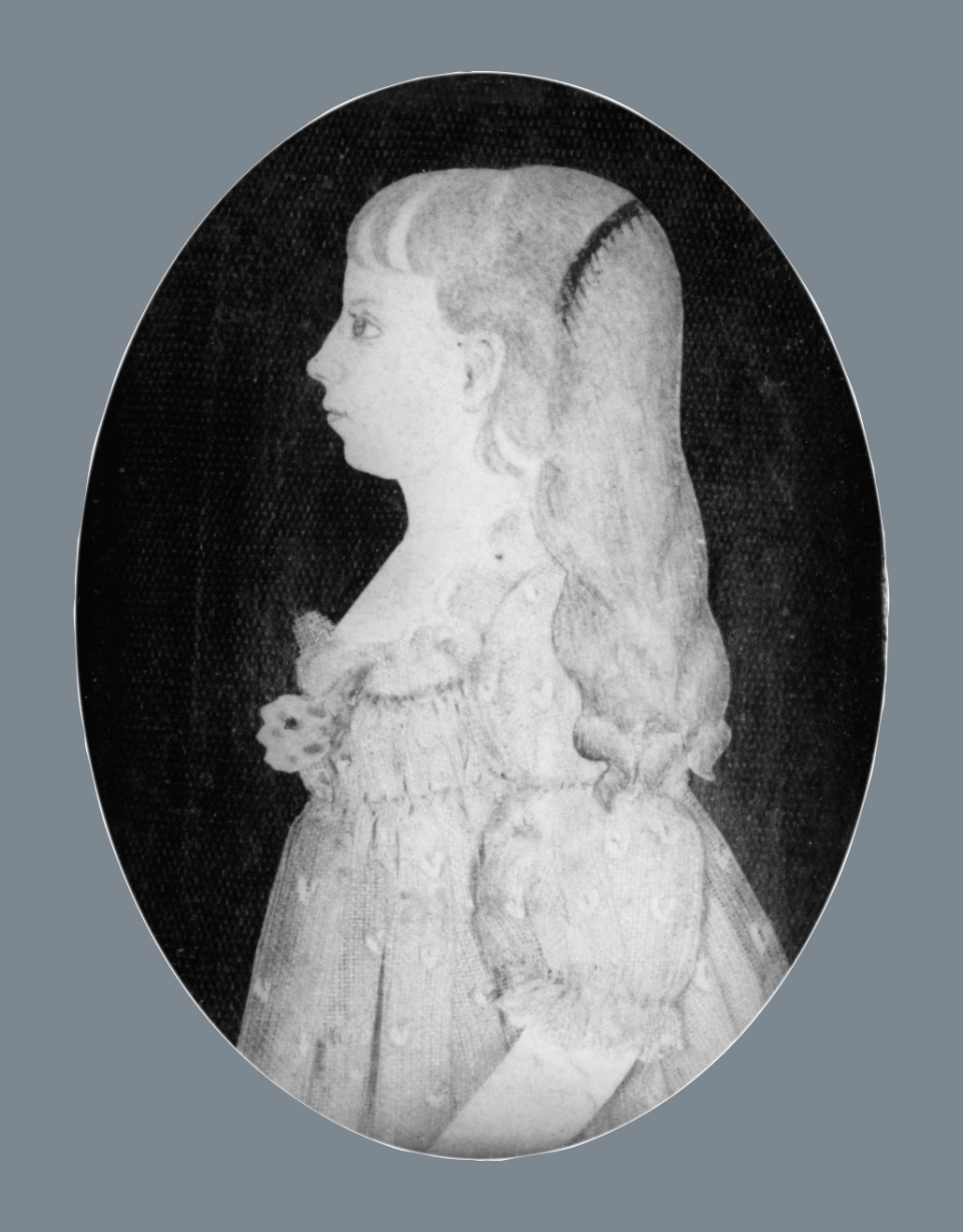
A "dressed" portrait miniature by Mary Way, in watercolor overlaid with linen, c. 1795. Collection of the Metropolitan Museum of Art.

Way was an artistic pioneer in early America. Jaffee calls her "very likely the first professional woman artist in the post-Revolutionary United States"; Baratt and Zabar, "one of the first professional women painters in America".

Way's miniatures were primarily in watercolor on ivory, although she also produced some oil paintings. Uniquely, Way "dressed" her miniatures with textiles and other embellishments: "the effect", Ramsay MacMullen observes, as of "a two-dimensional doll". An 1812 advertisement for her work in the New-York Evening Post noted that she "takes Likenesses upon Ivory & Glass, in colours or gold, Landscapes, or views of country Seats, &c. &c".

Kelly observes that Way's miniatures did not tend to follow technical developments in the genre, which included a shift to larger formats and brighter colors. Rather, she continued to use a more muted palette throughout her career.

She is known to have signed only one painting, of her cousin Charles Holt. Ehrlich suggests that Mary and her sister Elizabeth produced some paintings jointly.

Way's subjects included members of her New York church and contacts from her days in New London. One of her pieces purportedly portrays a young Theodosia Burr, and a separate one of her mother Theodosia Bartow Burr. She was acquainted with John Wesley Jarvis, Anson Dickinson, and Samuel Lovett Waldo, among others, who advised her and suggested improvements to her work.

In 1818, she was exhibited at the American Academy of the Fine Arts.

Way's work was largely unknown until the early 1990s, when it was documented in an article by art historian William Lamson Warren. Ongoing research on available samples, and new details about the composition of dressed miniatures. has been unearthed by Brian Ehrlich. A previously unknown pattern of rare Ipswich lace adorns a figure of Sarah Hamlin Sage.

Way's works are held at the Metropolitan Museum of Art in New York; the Lyman Allyn Art Museum in New London; and the Florence Griswold Museum in Old Lyme, Connecticut, among other institutions and in the hands of private collectors. An exhibition of the Way sisters' works, with an accompanying catalog, debuted in late 2021.

== Sources ==
- Jaffee, David (2010). A New Nation of Goods: The Material Culture of Early America. Philadelphia: University of Pennsylvania Press. ISBN 978-0-8122-2200-5.
- Johnson, Dale T. (1990). American Portrait Miniatures in the Manney Collection. New York: Abrams Books; Metropolitan Museum of Art. ISBN 978-0-87099-597-2.
