= Joseph Dana =

Silhouette image of Rev. Joseph Dana

Joseph Dana (November 2, 1742 – November 16, 1827) was an American clergyman. Dana was born in Pomfret, Connecticut and died in Ipswich, Massachusetts. He was a grandson of Benjamin, the third son of Richard, the progenitor of all that bear the name in the United States, who, according to the family tradition, was the son of a French Huguenot that settled in England in 1629. Joseph was graduated at Yale in 1760, studied theology, and was ordained on November 7, 1765, minister of the South society of Ipswich, over which he presided for sixty-two years.

Dana was the author of a report about local American industry that described the Ipswich lace production in his town. Documented lace samples were attached to the report and reside with Alexander Hamilton's papers in the Library of Congress archives.

== Works ==
Many of Dana's occasional discourses were published. A book of Occasional and textual hymns was published posthumously.
