= Brunonia Barry =

American novelist

- Born: 1950 (age 75–76); Salem, Massachusetts, U.S.
- Education: Green Mountain College; University of New Hampshire
- Occupation: Novelist
- Writing career
- Language: English
- Genre: Novels set in Salem

Brunonia Barry (born 1950 in Salem, Massachusetts) is an American novelist, the author of The Lace Reader and The Map of True Places. Her third novel, The Fifth Petal: a novel, was published on January 24, 2017. Barry, with husband Gary Ward, founded SmartGames, a game and puzzle software company.

== Biography ==
Born in Salem, Massachusetts in 1950, Sandra Brunonia Barry grew up in neighboring Marblehead She went to Green Mountain College in Vermont and to the University of New Hampshire. After a few years of trying to live on option money as a screenwriter, she turned to computers, working for several years in the sales and marketing division of Lotus Development Corp. In 2006, after writing it for six years, she and Ward self-published The Lace Reader, which utilized Ipswich lace as a plot device. Eventually the rights were sold to William Morrow for over 2 million dollars. Her second book, The Map of True Places, was published in 2010. She currently lives in Salem, Massachusetts.

In 2017 she worked with the North Shore YMCA to co-write a play about opioid use in the region.

== Selected bibliography ==
- The Lace Reader, William Morrow, 2006
- The Map of True Places, William Morrow, 2010
- The Fifth Petal, Crown, 2017

== Awards ==
- The International Women's Fiction Festival's Baccante Award
- Ragdale Artists' Colony's Strnad Fellowship
- New England Book Festival's award for Best Fiction
- Amazon's Best of the Month
