= The Map of True Places =

2010 novel by Brunonia Barry

- Author: Brunonia Barry
- Language: English
- Genre: novel
- Published: 2010 (HarperCollins)
- Publication place: USA
- Media type: Print (hardback)
- Pages: 406
- ISBN: 978-0-06-162478-0
- OCLC: 798223560

The Map of True Places is a 2010 novel by Brunonia Barry. It is about a psychotherapist, Zee Finch, who returns to her family home in Salem, Massachusetts.

== Reception ==
Library Journal, in a review of The Map of True Places, wrote "Barry wisely places her novel in atmospheric Salem, MA, as literary history, sailing, and witchcraft form the backbone of this tale." and "Although readers will be perched on the edge of their seats while consuming this mesmerizing, suspenseful tale, there are a few convoluted and confusing aspects among the details. Fans will also appreciate the brief reappearances of characters from Barry's debut."

The Washington Post found that "For the first 100 pages, "The Map of True Places" maintains a somber and thoughtful tone, a little over-burdened by lofty themes" but then "the literary novel swerves into romance -- as well as thriller." and concluded "it may be that Brunonia Barry simply rushed out this one to please her publishers and public. I hope that is the case, because the voice behind the plot turns is both likable and engaging."

The Map of True Places has also been reviewed by Booklist, BookPage Reviews, Publishers Weekly, and Kirkus Reviews.
