= The Fifth Petal =

2017 novel by Brunonia Barry

The Fifth Petal: a novel
- Author: Brunonia Barry
- Language: English
- Genre: Novel, Thriller
- Published: 2017 (Crown)
- Publication place: USA
- Media type: Print (hardback)
- Pages: 439
- ISBN: 978-1-101-90560-9
- OCLC: 968210989

The Fifth Petal: a novel is a 2017 novel by Brunonia Barry. It is the third novel of Barry's set in Salem, Massachusetts and is about the investigation of the murder of a teenager that has eerie similarities to a series of murders that occurred twenty years previously.

== Reception ==
Library Journal, in a review of The Fifth Petal, wrote "While a few quibbling questions may bedevil fans of Barry's The Lace Reader, the many suspenseful, intriguing events presented in this sort-of-sequel are sure to haunt them." and concluded "Banshees, lost memories, and secret pasts each play a significant role in this novel; enthusiasts of the author's earlier work and readers interested in the history of witchcraft and the occult will enjoy this return visit to Salem. "

The New York Journal of Books found "There’s more than a murder mystery in The Fifth Petal. It’s also a history lesson, as well as a moral one .. a story that should give us much thought while it entertains."

The Fifth Petal has also been reviewed by Booklist (starred review), Publishers Weekly, Kirkus Reviews,
