= Point de Gaze =

Belgian lace

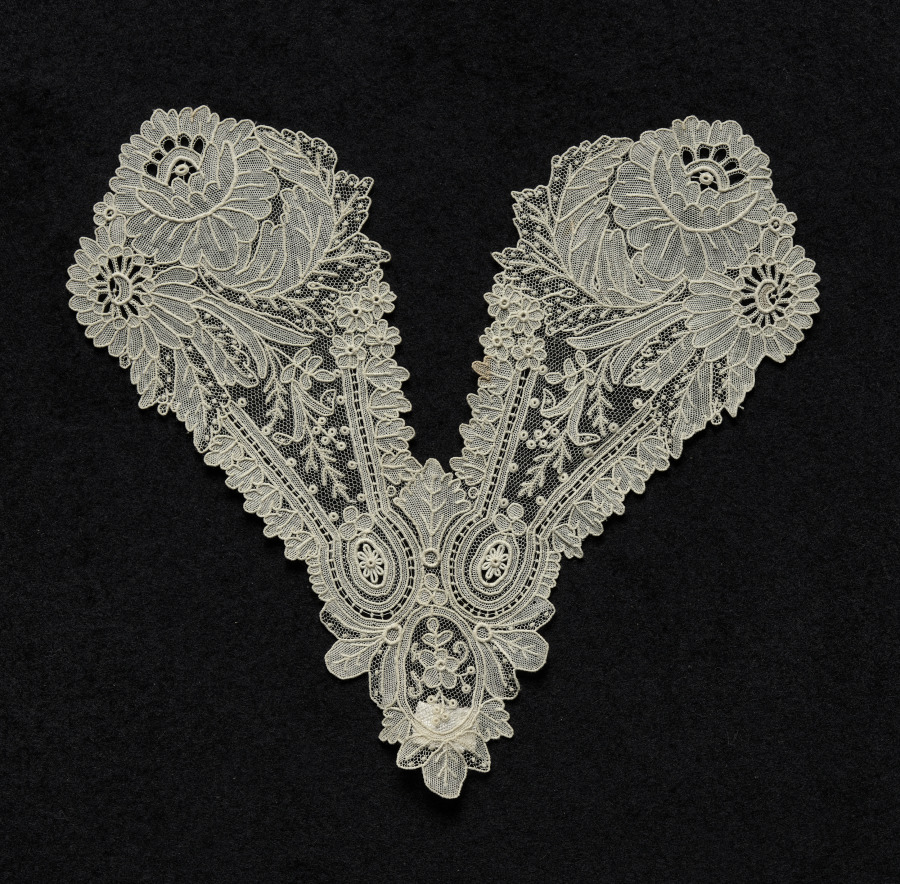
- Point de Gaze Jabot, 19th century, Brussels, Belgium
- Type: Lace
- Production method: Needle lace
- Production process: Craft production
- Place of origin: Brussels, Belgium
- Introduced: 19th century

Point de Gaze (sometimes Point de Gauze) is a needle lace from Belgium named for the gauze-like appearance of the mesh ground. It was made from the early to mid 1800s to sometime between 1914 and the 1930s.

== Etymology ==
The word lace is from Middle English, from Old French las, noose, string, from Vulgar Latin *laceum, from Latin laqueus, noose; probably akin to lacere, to entice, ensnare. This type of lace takes its name from the fact that its ground mesh is very loose.At one time, the French names of bobbin and needle laces were preceded by the word "point."

== Characteristics ==
Point de Gaze is made of open, twisted buttonhole stitches of very fine thread. The buttonholes connect through each other, yielding a light, gauze-like ground fabric. This type of lace uses floral designs, with both garden and wild flowers evident. Also found are ferns and leaves. These floral designs frequently included borders, scrolls, and other non-floral elements. Either cotton or linen thread can be used to make it. It was used to make clothing (dresses, shawls, and flounces) as well as accessories, such as handkerchiefs, parasols, and fans.

== Origins and history ==
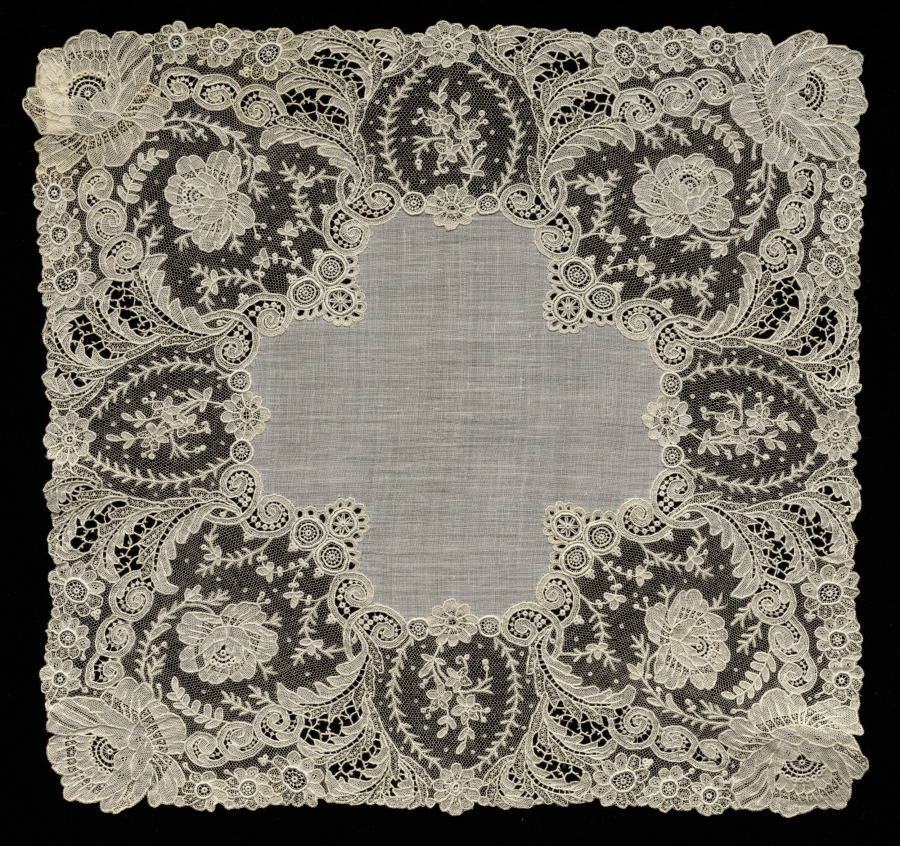
Point de Gaze lace handkerchief, 19th century Flanders

Point de Gaze is a type of needlepoint lace that originated in the area of Brussels, Belgium. It was constructed from the middle of the 19th century until approximately the start of World War I in 1914 or until the 1930s. One source indicates that its manufacture started earlier, in the 1830s.

The Schiffli machine, which used net to mimic the gauze-like texture, was able to imitate the production of hand-made Point de Gaze lace.
