= Lille lace =

Type of bobbin lace from Lille, France

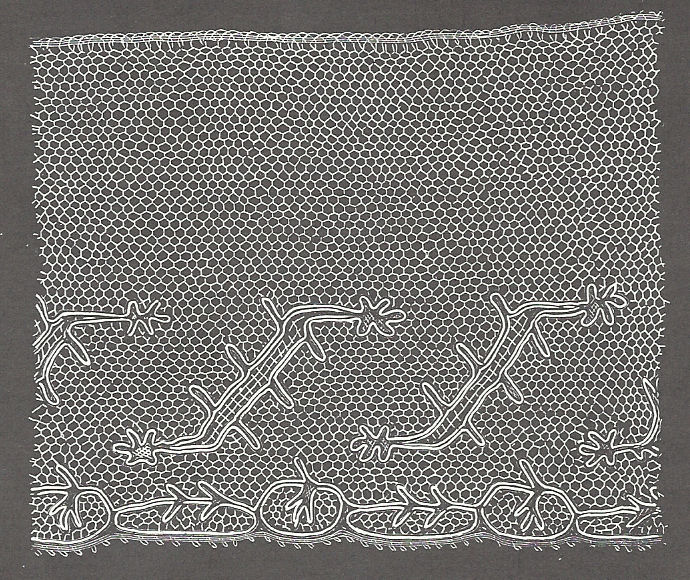
Lille lace

Lille lace was a type of bobbin lace that was made at Lille, also known as Rijsel. It was a lightweight lace popular in the eighteenth century in both black and white. It lacked the rich designs of Valenciennes lace. Its quality declined after the French Revolution, and by 1800 it was worn only by 'the most ordinary women'. In the first half of the nineteenth century the sketch-line designs, made only of gimp, were enclosed by a cloudy fond simple, relieved only by a scattering of tiny dots (point d'esprit). After the French Revolution of 1848, little was made commercially.
