= Mechlin lace =

Type of Flemish bobbin lace

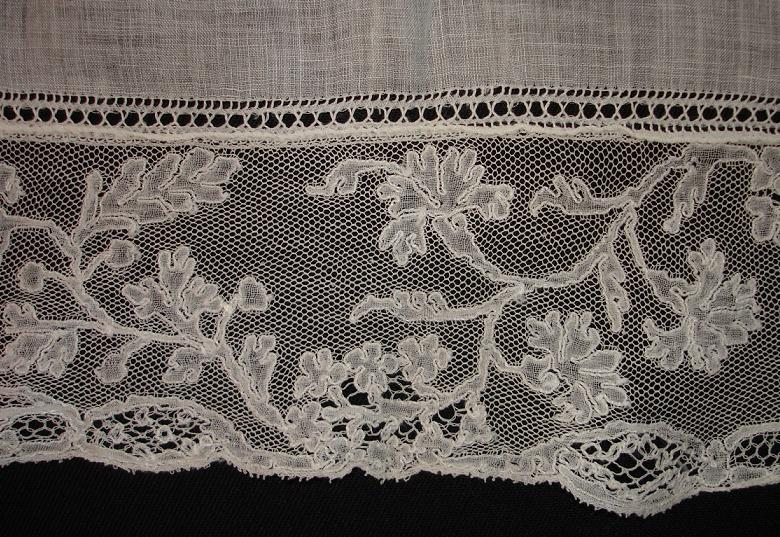
18th century

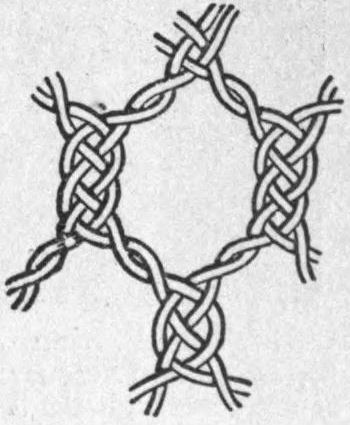
detail of the ground

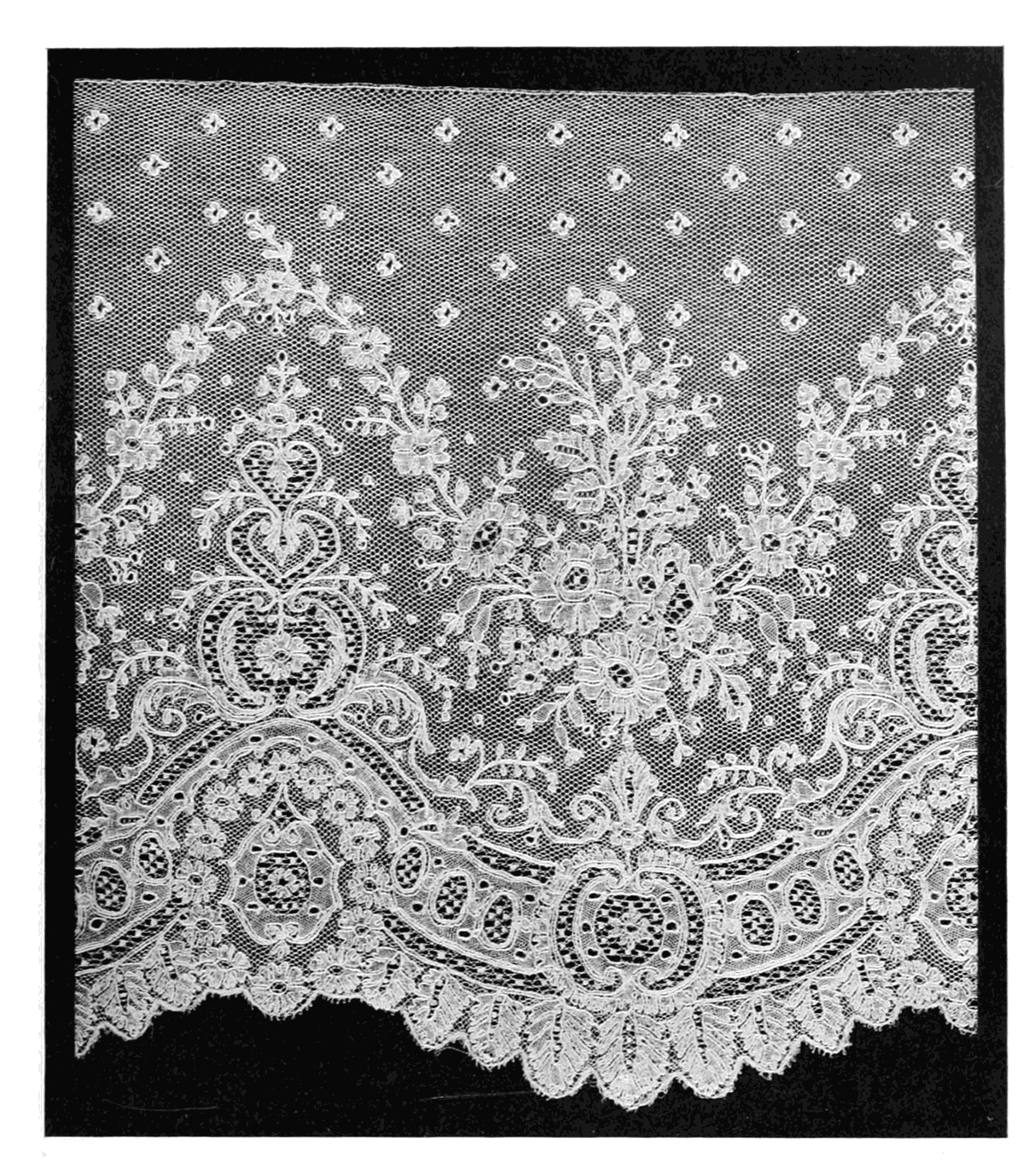
19th century, exclusive quality sample

Mechlin lace or Point de Malines is an old bobbin lace, one of the best known Flemish laces, originally produced in Mechelen. Worn primarily during summer, it is fine, transparent, and looks best when worn over another color. Used for women's clothing, it was popular until the first decade of the 20th century. It was made in Mechelen, Antwerp, Lier and Turnhout. It was used for coiffures de nuit (evening hair-styling), garnitures de corset (corset trims), ruffles and cravats.

== History ==
Its history goes back to the Brabant laces. Originally the term 'mechlin lace' was used for any bobbin lace from Flanders. Mechlin lace grew in popularity throughout the late 17th century and the 18th century, and was mentioned several times. The 1657 inventory of the Maréchal de la Motte included 'a pair of Mechlin ruffles'. Jean-François Regnard, when visiting Flanders in 1681, wrote of the lace and lace-makers. When the English prohibition was removed in 1699, Mechlin lace became the grand fashion in England, and it was advertised in the London Gazette. It was very popular at this time in France and Holland as well. The earliest with a réseau (open net) ground wasn't made until 1720, and at this point the term became specific to this lace with the open net. In 1755 Mechlin lace went into decline in England, and by 1834 there were only eight manufacturers left. Machine-made Mechlin lace started to be produced in 1819. Another machine was invented in 1847 which exactly followed the hand movements a lace-maker would make. Manufacture has since died out.

Mechlin lace was also very popular with the English royalty. Queen Mary II, in spite of the prohibition against imported laces, purchased two yards of knotted fringe for her Mechlin ruffles in 1694. Queen Anne purchased a sizeable amount of it— 83 yards in 1713. George I had a Mechlin cravat, and it was a favorite of Queen Charlotte and Princess Amelia.

== Appearance ==
Mechlin lace is known for its rich floral patterns, fine twisted-and-plaited, hexagonal ground, and its outlined designs. It looks much like Brussels lace, however it is made all at once, with the réseau or ground made at the same time as the pattern on the pillow. Also, the plait is shorter, and the mesh smaller than those of Brussels lace. All Mechlin laces are outlined with a loosely spun silk cord used to define the pattern, whereas Valenciennes lace isn't. Mechlin lace is also more expensive than Valenciennes lace, as it takes more time to make because of the different réseau.

Sometimes Mechlin is grounded with an ornamental réseau, instead of the usual hexagons. In the regular hexagonal réseau, the two sides parallel to the long axis of the lace are plaited three times, and the other four sides crossed. The same threads pass across the whole width, and thus form both the ground and the pattern.

== Gallery ==
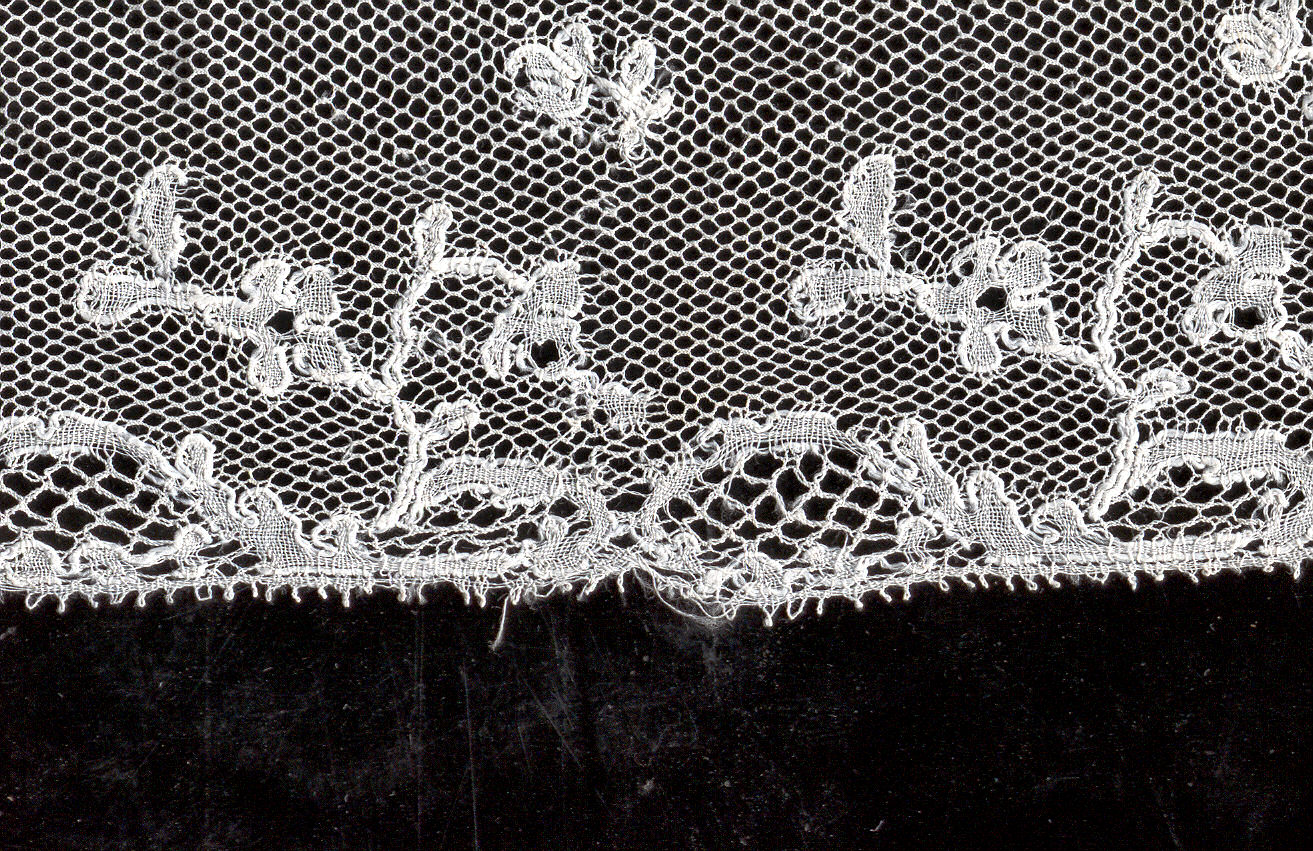

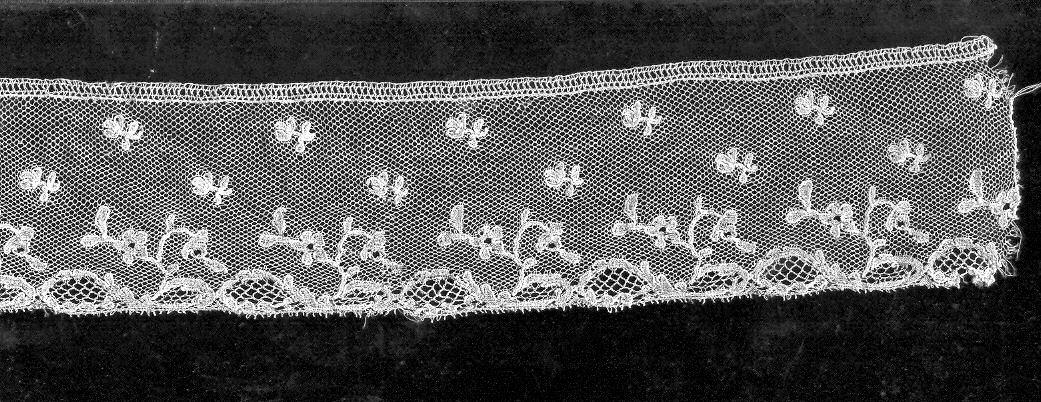

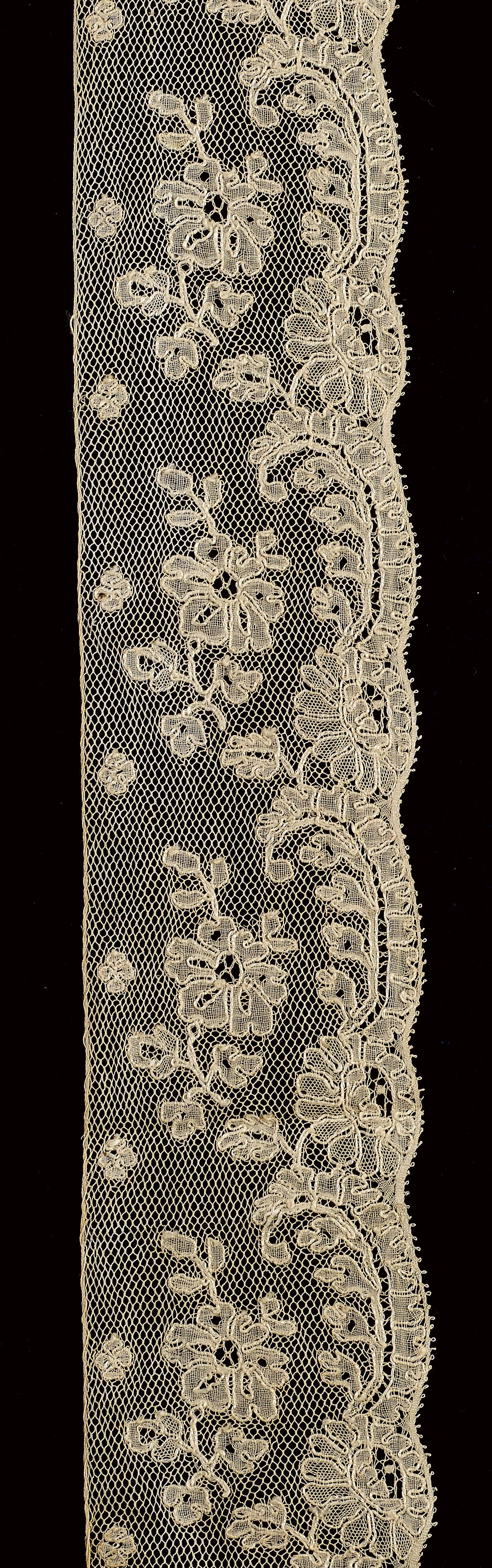

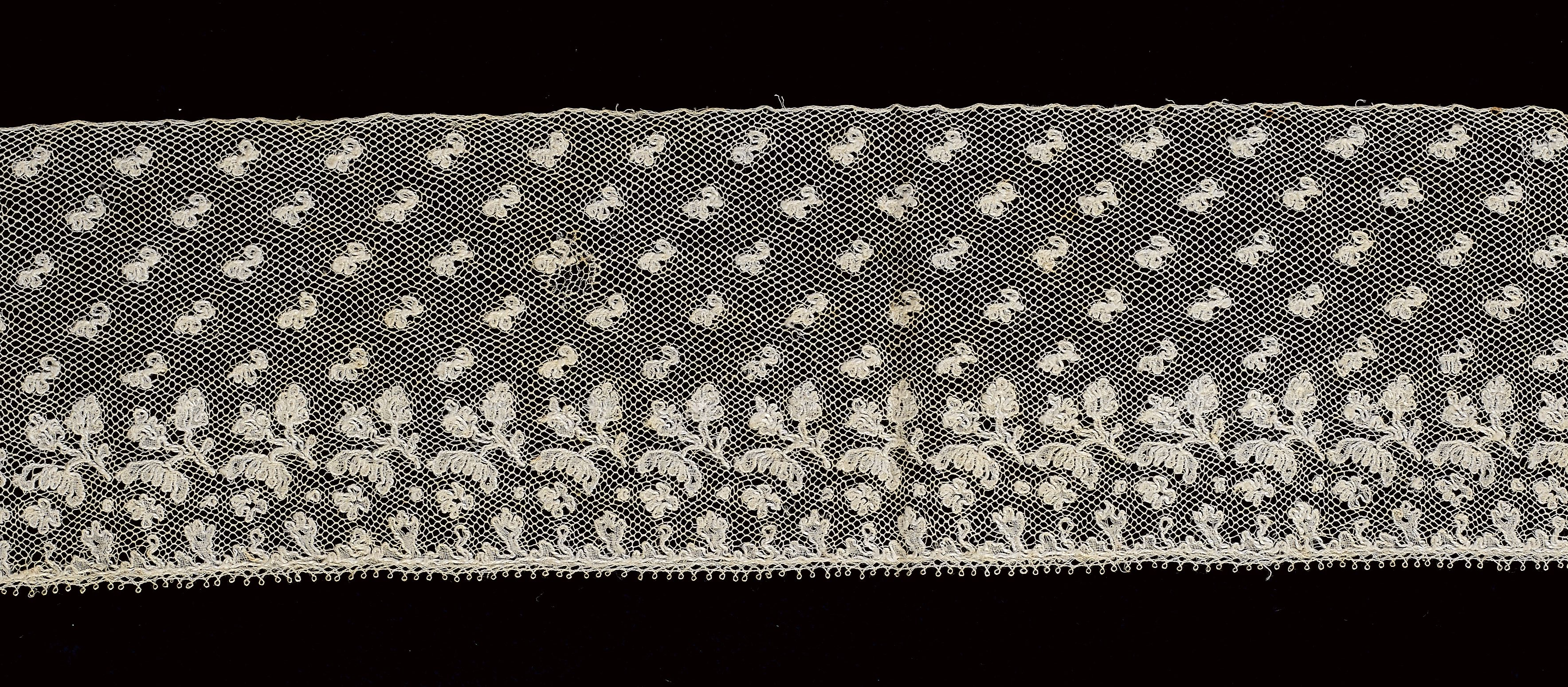

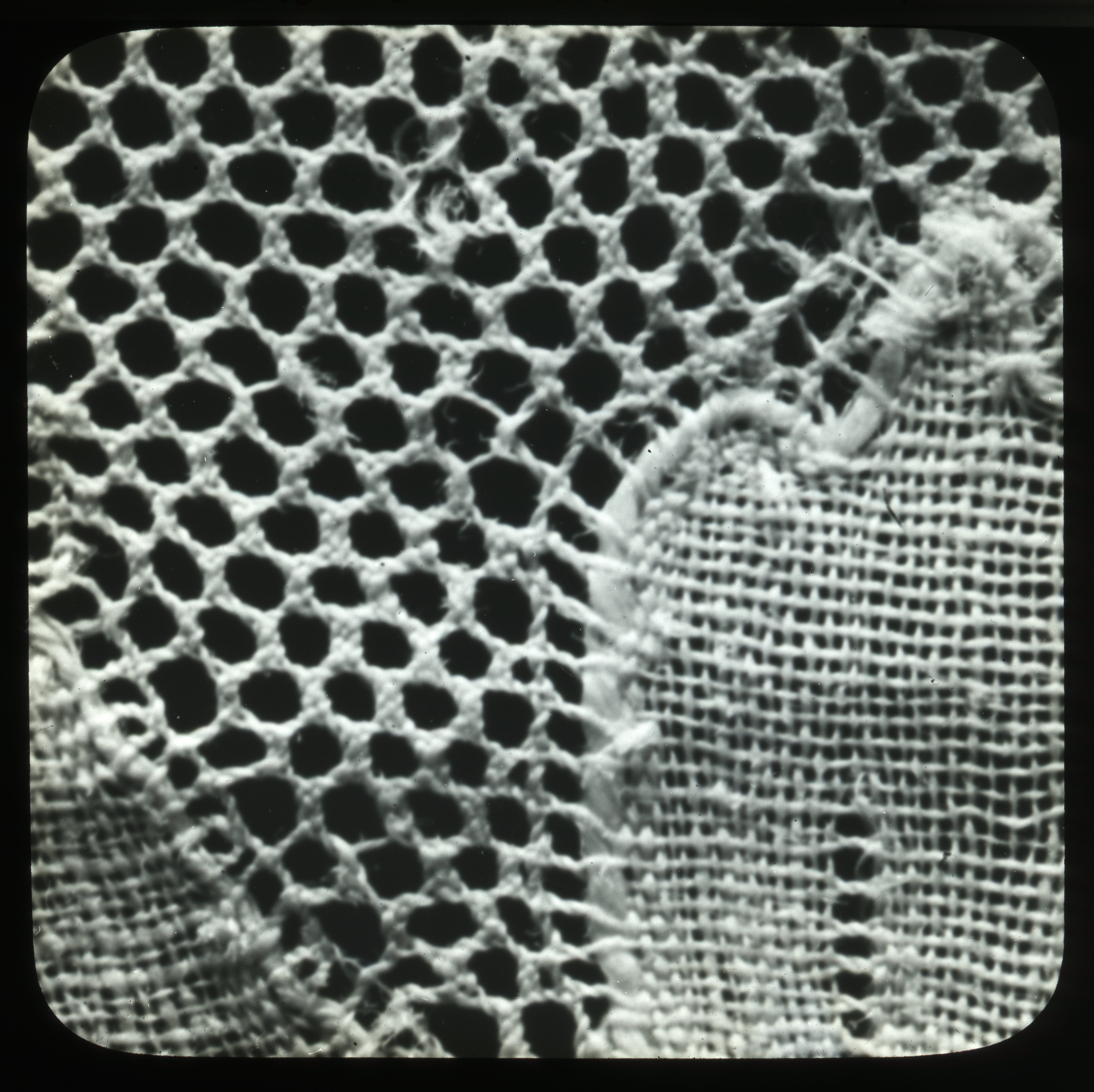

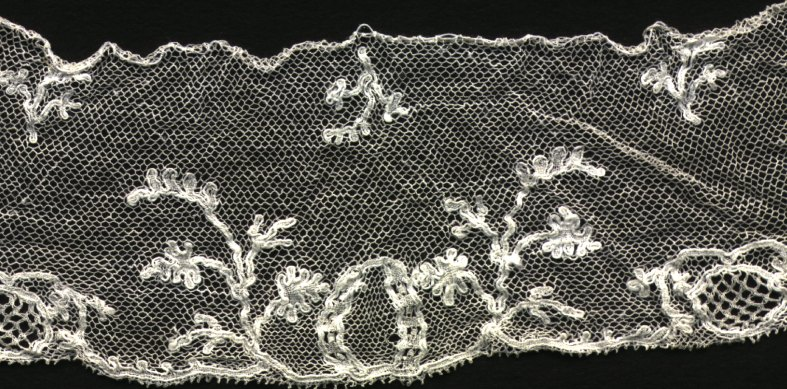

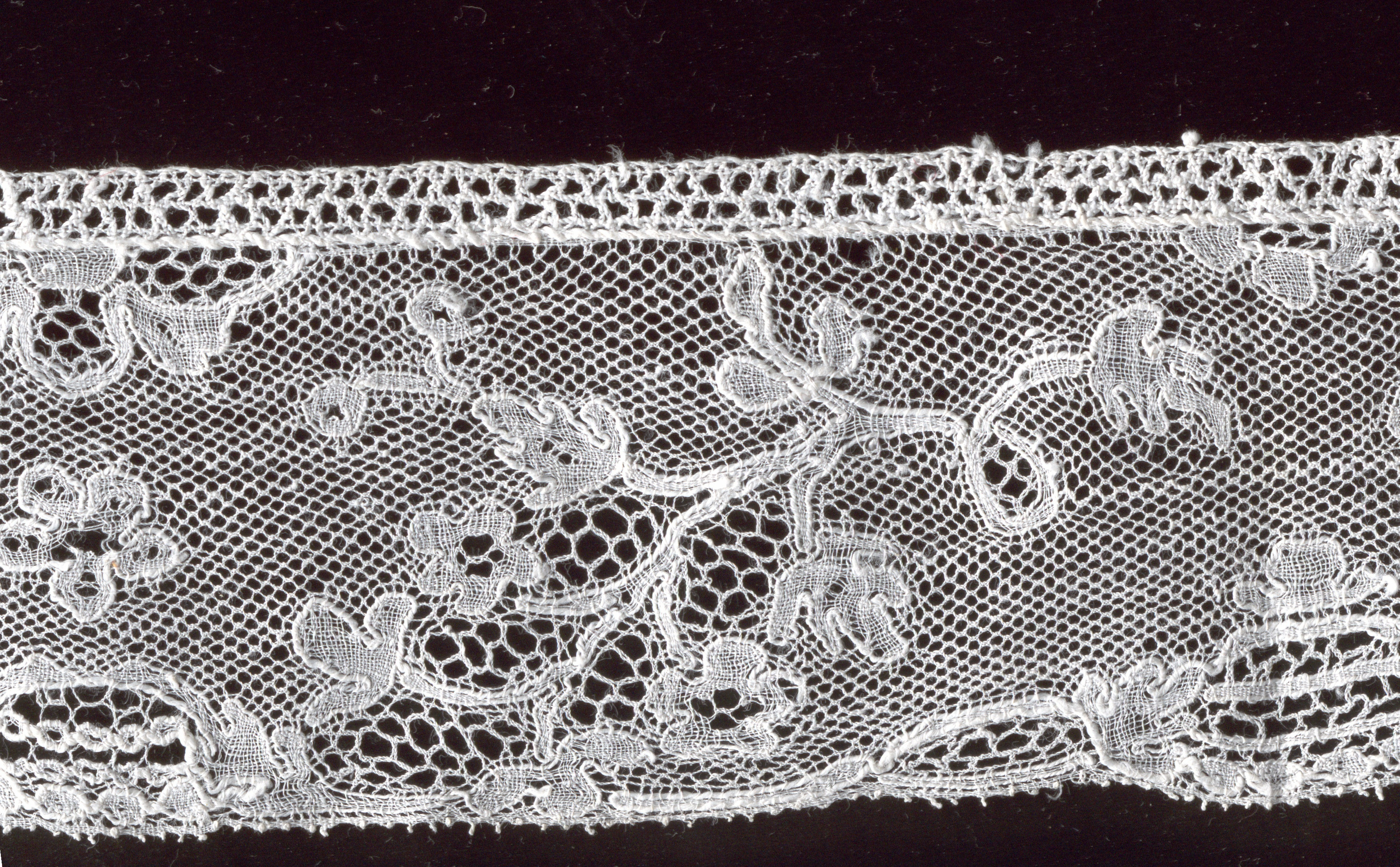

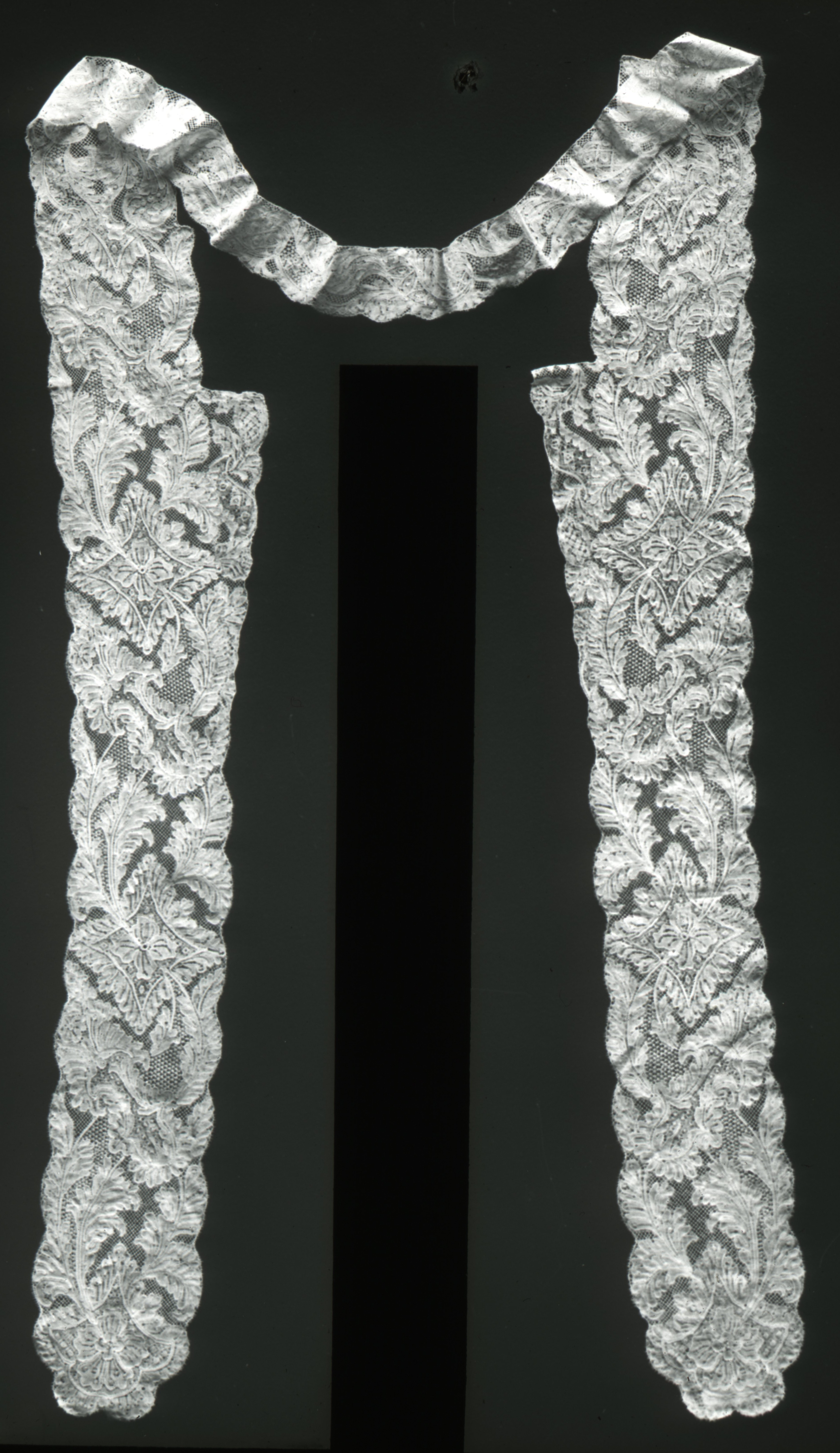

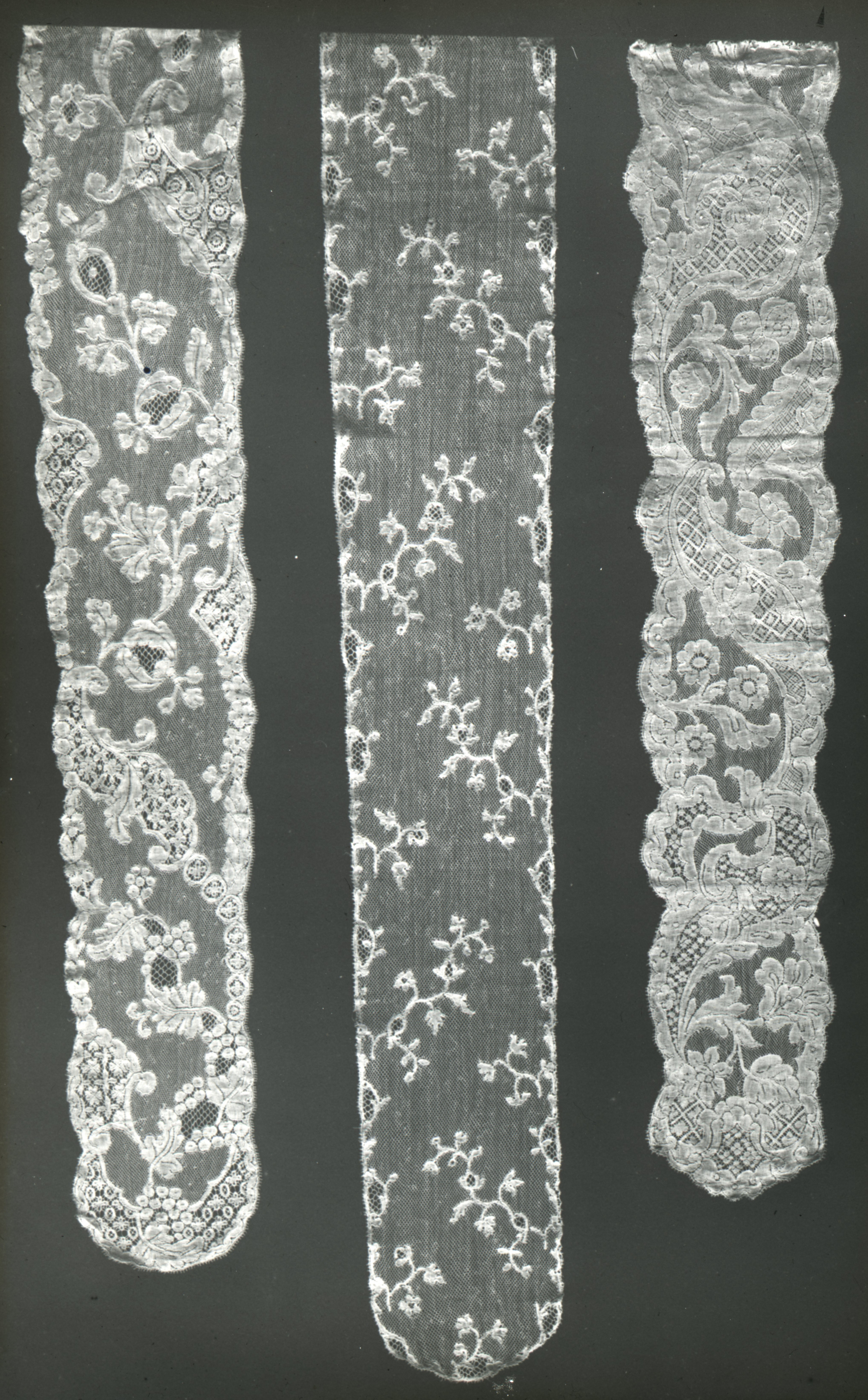

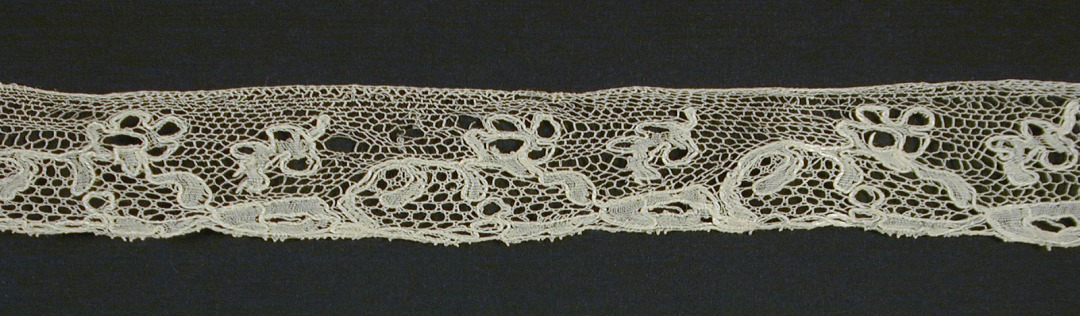

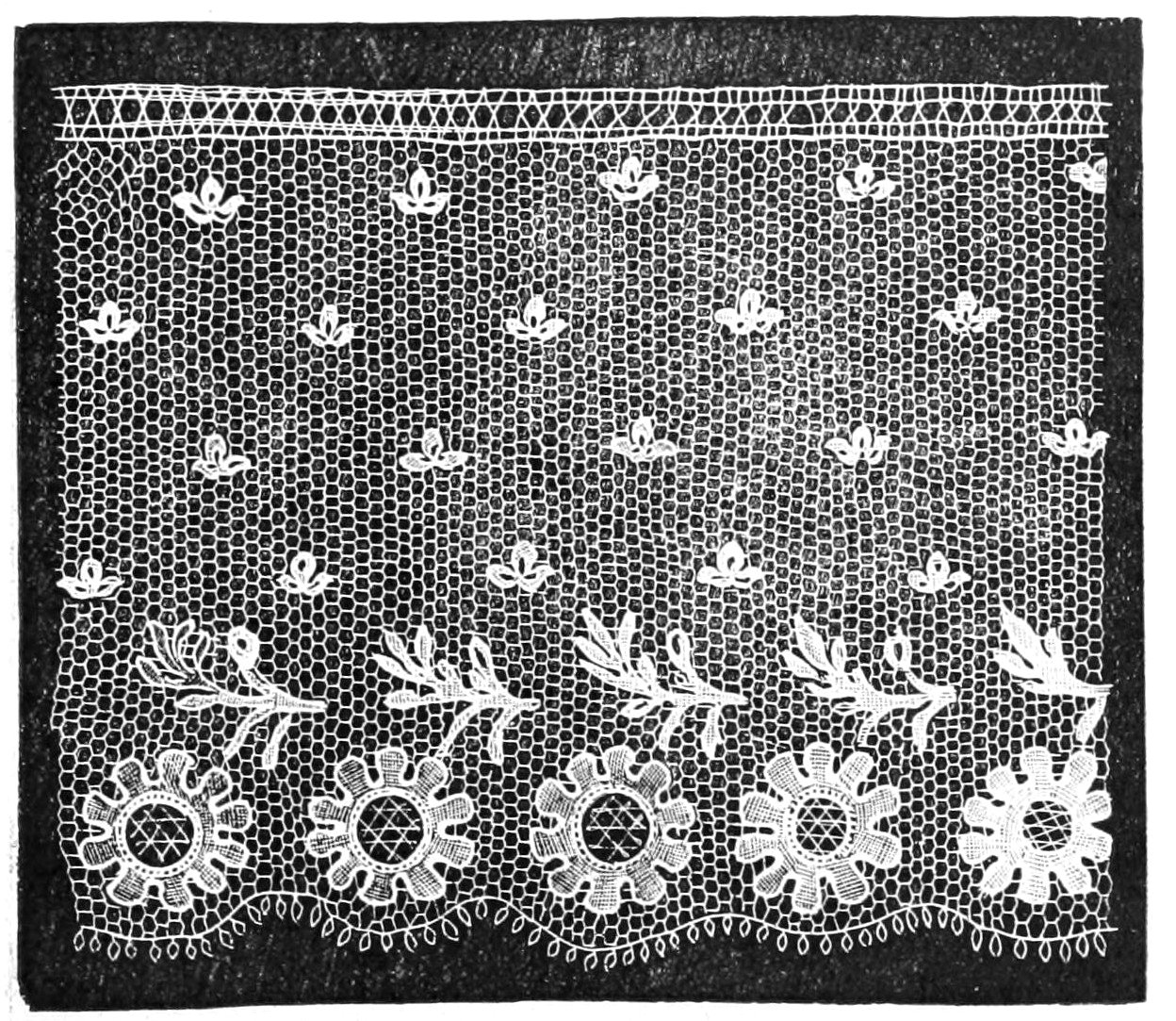

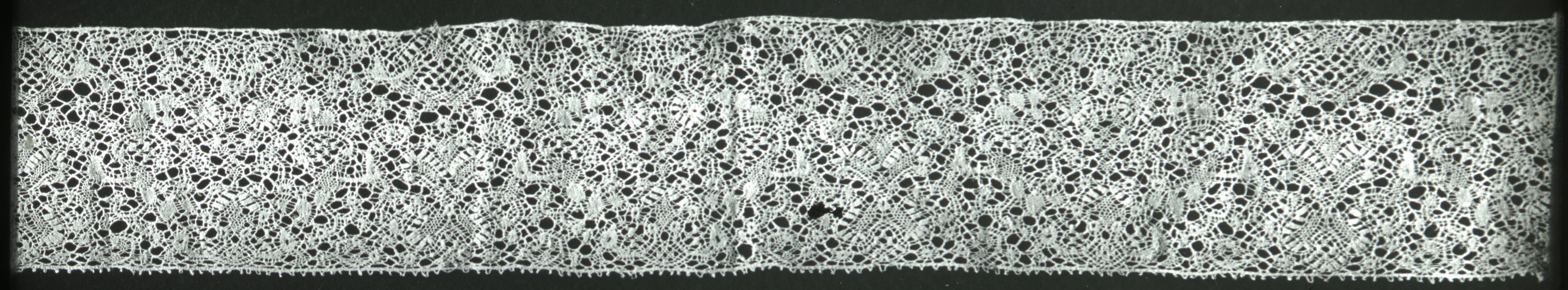

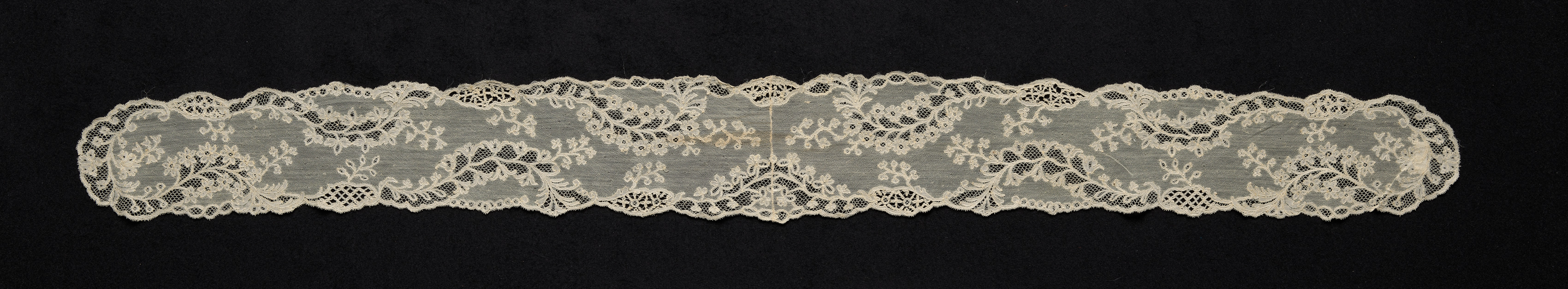
