= Freehand =

Freehand may refer to:

- Freehand drawing, a drawing made without the help of devices
- Freehand lace, a bobbin lace worked directly onto fabric
- Drum roll § Freehand technique, drumming technique
- Adobe FreeHand, software package
- Free Hand, a 1975 album by Gentle Giant

== Companies ==
- Freehand Books, literary imprint
- Freehand Productions, media company

== See also ==
- Free Hands
- Handsfree
