= Schneeberg =

Schneeberg may refer to:

- Schneeberg (Alps), a mountain in Lower Austria
- Schneeberg (Fichtel Mountains), a mountain in Bavaria
- Schneeberg, Bavaria, a town in Lower Franconia
- Schneeberg, Saxony, a town in the Ore Mountains
  - Schneeberg lace, a type of bobbin lace named for the town
- Ervin Schneeberg (1919–1995), American businessman and politician
