= Bobbin tape lace =

Part lace of bobbin-lace tapes

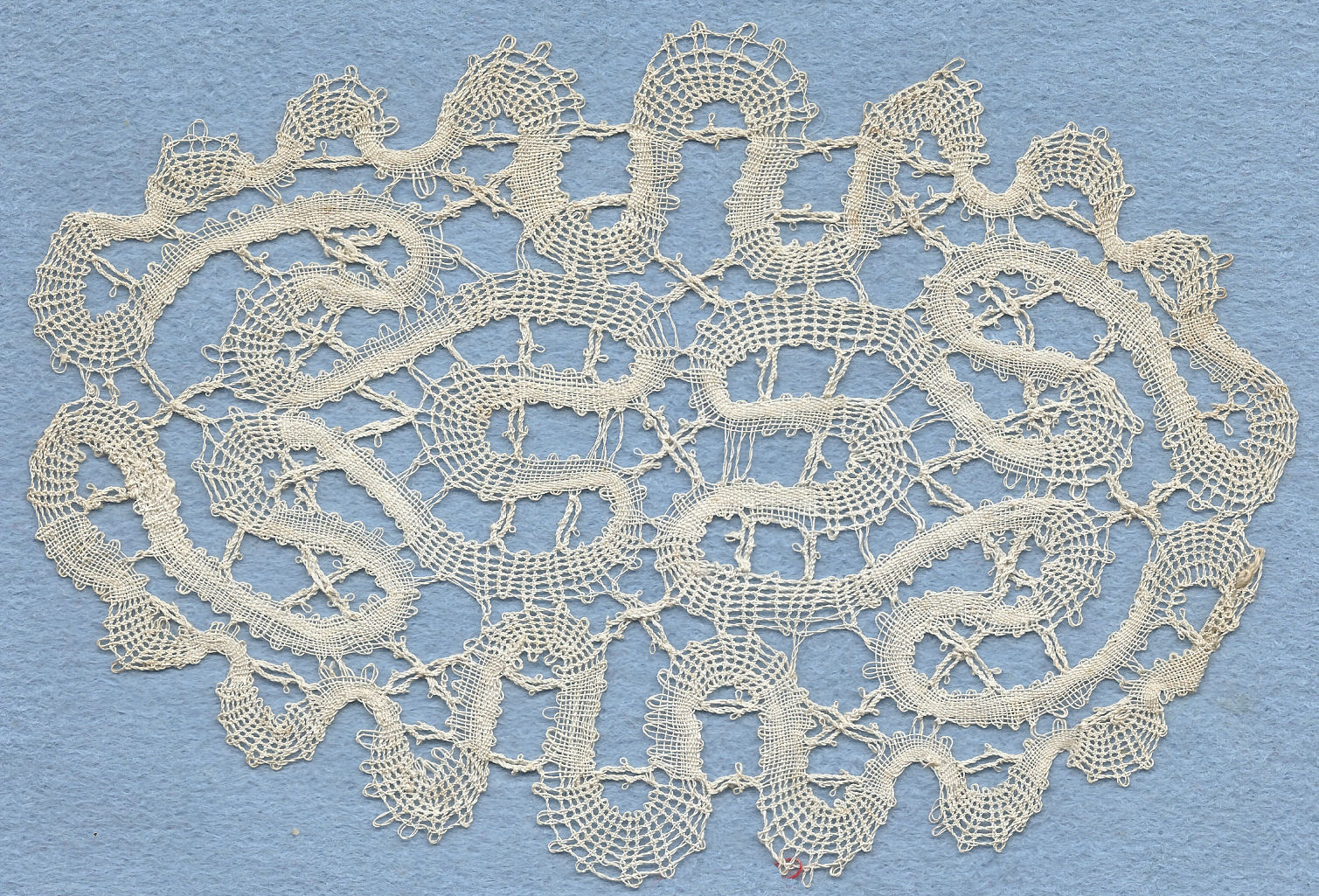
Bobbin tape lace

Bobbin tape lace is bobbin lace where the design is formed of one or more tapes curved so they make an attractive pattern. The tapes are made at the same time as the rest of the lace, and are joined to each other, or themselves, using a crochet hook.

The tapes are made curved, and by hand, using bobbin lace techniques. This should be distinguished from mixed tape lace, which is made using an existing straight tape, often machine made.

Types of bobbin tape lace include Russian lace, Idrija, Schneeberg, Milanese lace and Hinojosa lace. A novel branch of tape lace known as "3 Pair Flanders" or "Fiandra a 3 paia" developed in Gorizia. This lace is researched and taught today by the L'Associazione Fuselliamo in the region.

Bobbin tape lace is sometimes categorized as part lace.
