= Bruges lace =

Type of part lace from Bruges, Belgium

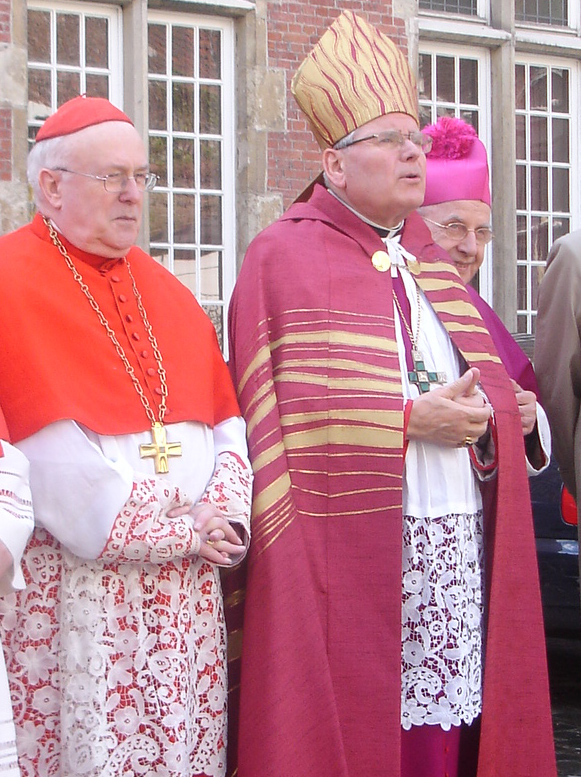
Bruges lace is preferred by the high clergy.

Bruges lace (Brugs Bloemwerk) is a fine white part lace made of cotton. It is made in pieces, with the designs later joined to make the final lace.

== Types ==
There are 2 types of Bruges lace, which include the finer flower-work type and the rough variant. The finer type, called Bruges Duchess' lace, is often used in clothing and veils, while the rough type is used for interior decorations. It has the characteristics of being quite simple to take care of, and can be washed and bleached at high temperatures without loss of form or quality. Bruges lace was in high production between 1850 and 1950.

Bruges flower lace is assembled from elegant leaves, long scrolls, and open flowers. They often have typical patterns and can be produced in large pieces for use in formal settings, such as churches. These features are joined with plaits with picots, fillings, leaf plaits and braids.

A modern lace school in Bruges, called the Kantcentrum, delivers lace courses and workshops. It also runs its own publishing house for books and lace patterns.

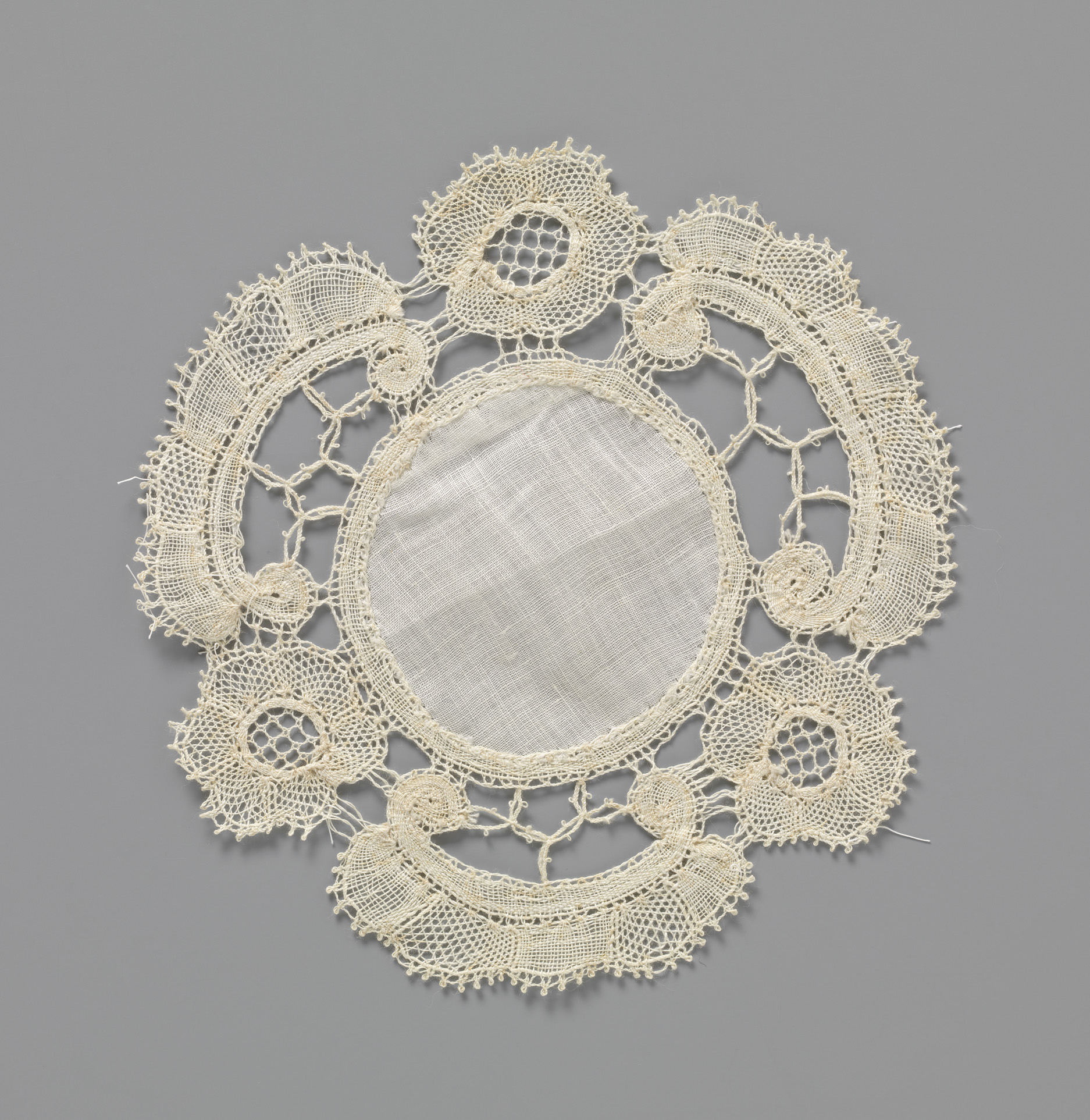
Bruges floral work. Round model with a round center piece of batiste. The repeating pattern alternates between a c-scroll and rose flower. The motifs are worked in net and linen stitch with openwork edges. The motifs are highlighted by contour threads. In the flower centers, a decorative ground has been applied, a closed stitch ground. Between the motifs, some connections have been made with double braids with picots, forming three-pointed stars. The scalloped edge arises from the pattern and is finished all around with picots. Rijksmuseum, CC0, via Wikimedia Commons
