= Cogne lace =

Type of bobbin lace from Cogne, Italy

Cogne lace (French: dentelles de Cogne) is a handmade bobbin lace that is made in Cogne, in the Aosta Valley in Italy. It takes the form of strips of lace, due to the manner in which it is made on a drum.

== History ==
The tradition of Cogne lace began with the flight of the Benedictine sisters from the Cluny Abbey to the Aosta Valley in 1665. They found refuge at Saint-Nicolas and first taught bobbin lacemaking in the area, though the diffusion of their teaching was not wide. Notebooks chronicling life in Cogne, written by inhabitants some decades after the events described, document the arrival of lacemaking in the mid-1800s. However, local lacemakers had different recollections. Physical evidence in the form of similar lace-making horses indicate that the lace was introduced from great lace centers in France and Flanders via the neighboring Alpine regions. It was used by the women of Cogne to decorate their traditional black and white dress, with a black lace head kerchief and a white lace collar.

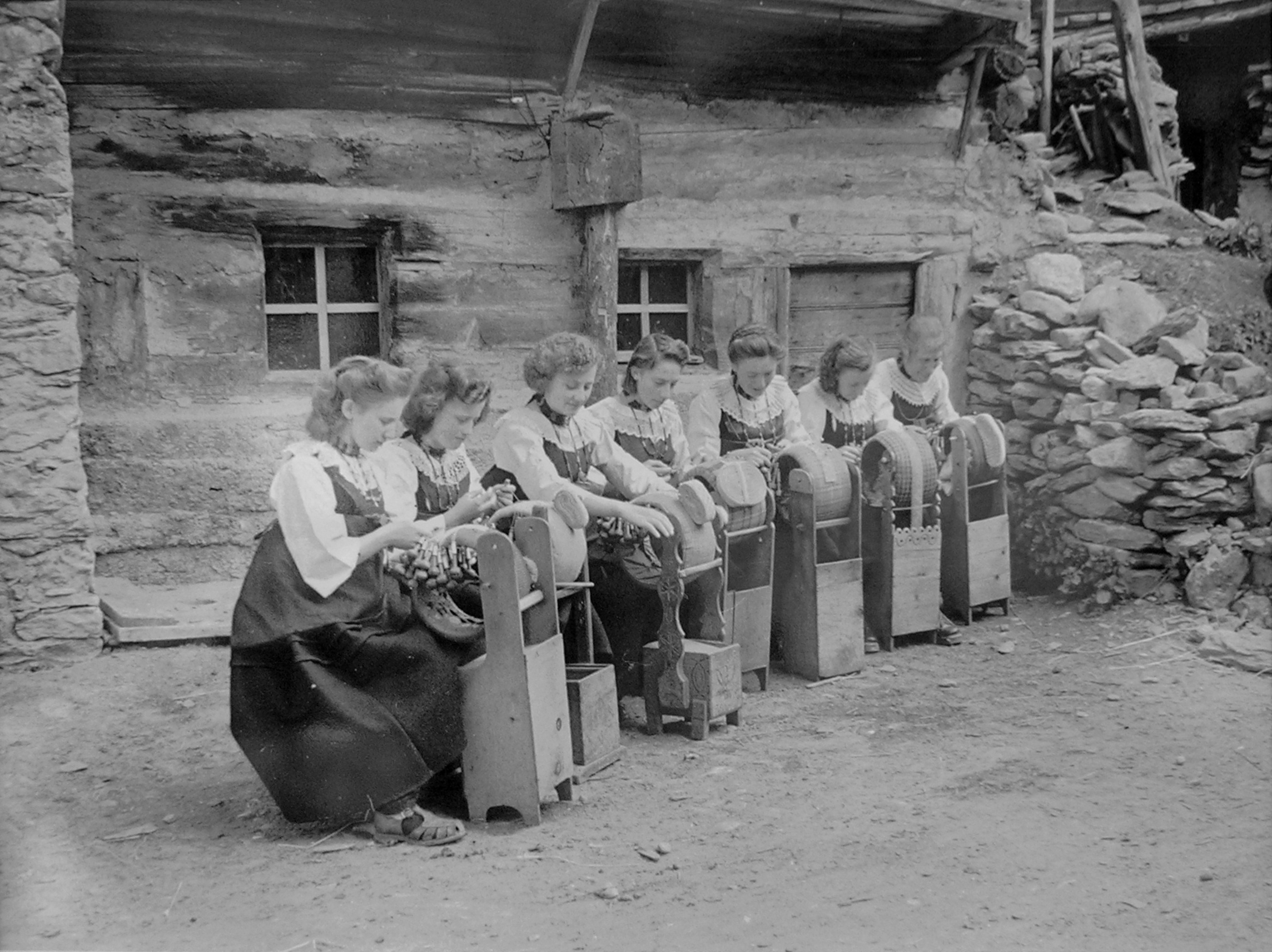
Cogne lacemakers at work

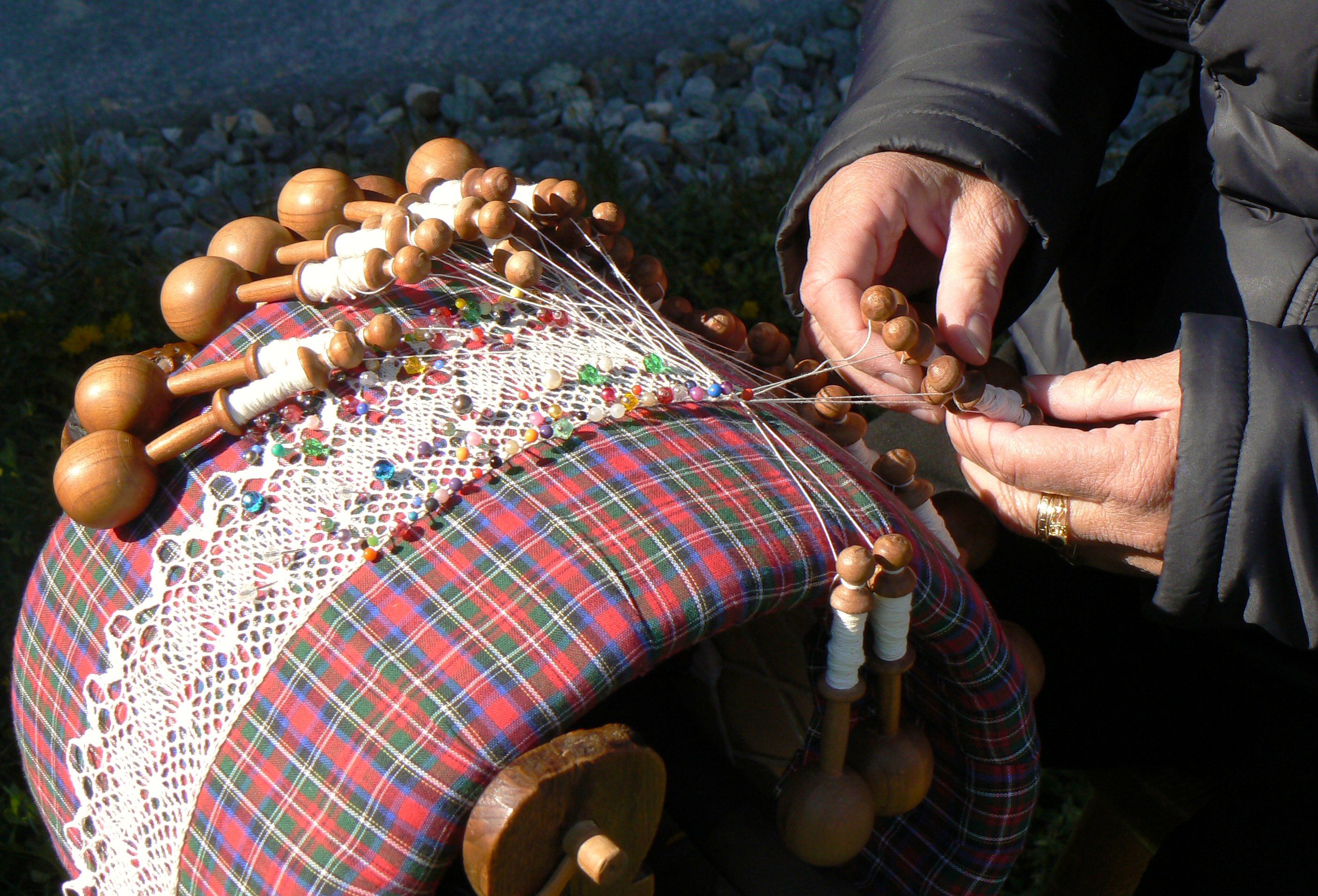
A bobbin lacemaker using the pillow horse

== Equipment ==
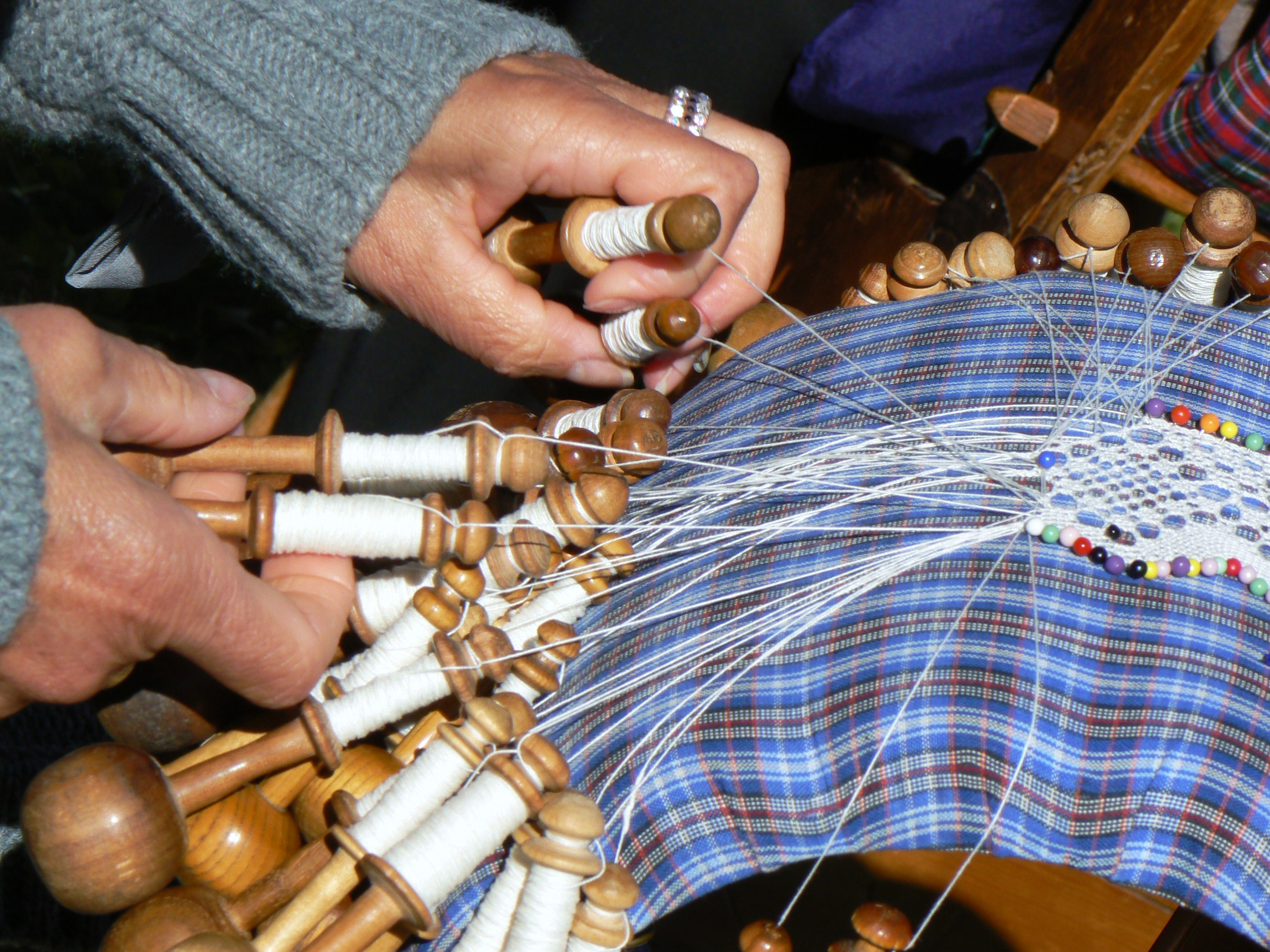
Work with bobbins

Cogne lace is handmade on a base or horse called a "cavalot", made of wood decoratively carved with rosettes or flower symbols. It may include the monogram of Christ, the year it was made, and the name of its first owner. The base supports the coessein (patois cognein for "pillow", cf. French coussin), a wide cylinder stuffed with straw or wool. Generally a male relative or fiancé made the pillow horse, which have a drawer to hold thread, pins, and bobbins.

The bobbins are made of hard wood, such as apple, pear, cherry, walnut and ash, trees all found in the Alps. The lower potions of the bobbins, used as handles, are round.

== Lace Designs ==
Cogne lace is characterized by being made without any pattern, rather it is made in an entirely mnemonic way, and uses the design on the fabric, usually checks but sometimes stripes, covering the "coessein". It is categorized as freehand lace. It produces bands that are only a few centimeters wide, up to a maximum of 7–8 cm (approximately 3 inches). The patterned fabric allows the lacemaker to keep her selvages straight, using large pins.

== Today ==
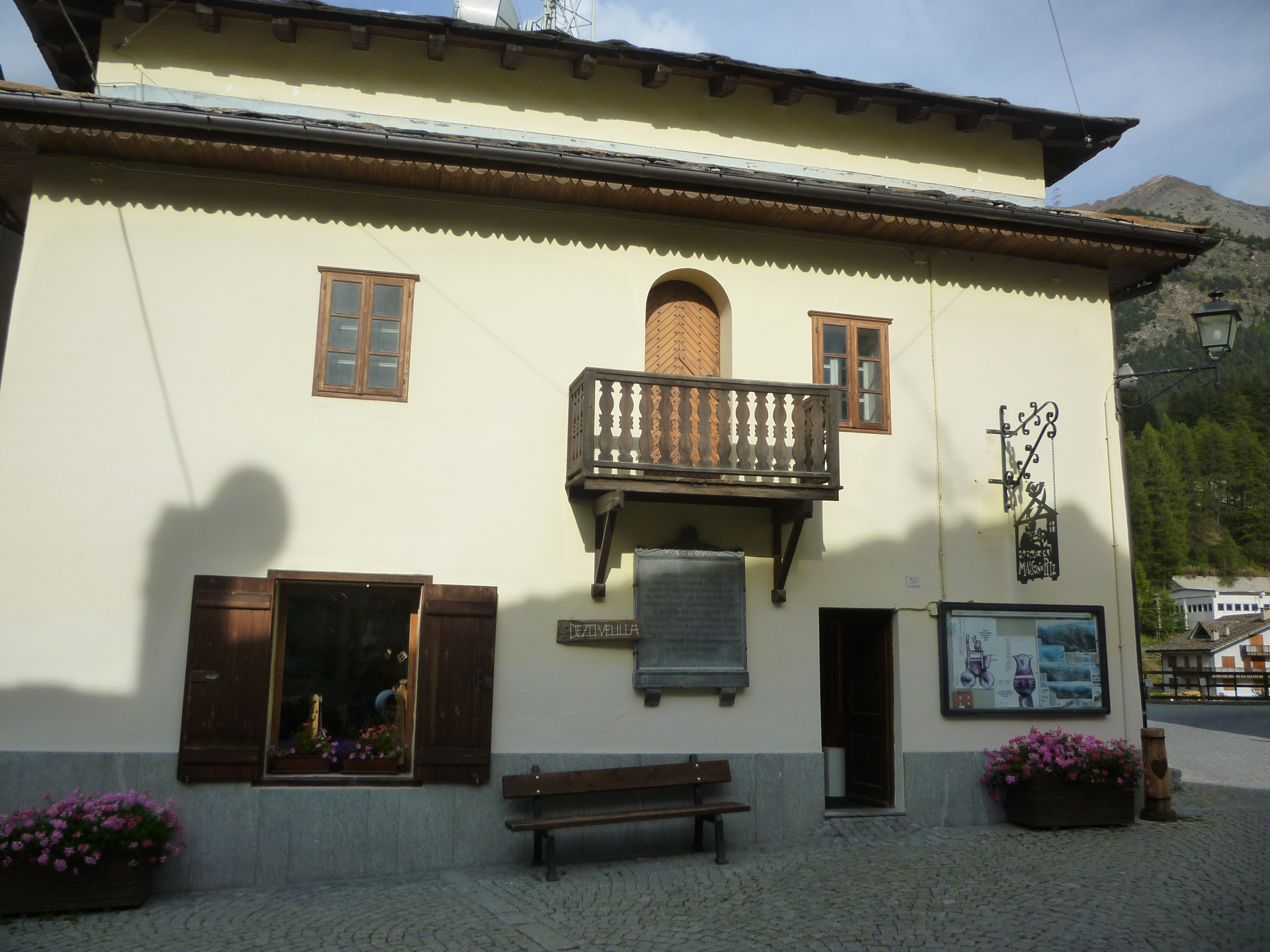
La Mèison di pitz, heritage museum, located in rue Docteur César-Emmanuel Grappein, in Cogne

The Mèison di pitz (Lace House, in patois cognein) is the permanent museum housing Cogne lace.

== See also ==
- Bobbin lace
- Freehand lace

== Bibliography ==
- Attilio Boccazzi Varotto, Dentelles de Cogne, éd. Priuli & Verlucca, 1996.
