= Part lace =

Lace formed from knotted bobbin motifs

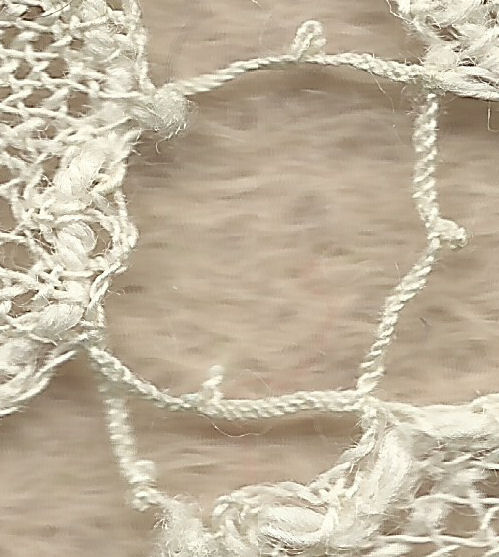
Honiton lace, showing plait knotted into motif

Part lace or sectional lace is a way of making bobbin lace. It characterises various styles, such as Honiton lace or Brussels lace.

All bobbin lace is made with bobbins on a lace pillow. Some styles of lace are made in a continuous strip. Since there is a limit to how many bobbins can be handled on a pillow, this limits how wide the lace is. Part lace, on the other hand, is made in pieces or motifs. Once made, these are joined together in a ground, net or mesh, or with plaits, bars or legs. This means that the lace has no limit in size, apart from the time needed to make it.

It can also be made by a team of lacemakers. "Real Honiton laces are made up of bits and bits fashioned by many different women in their own little cottages - here a leaf, there a flower, slowly woven through the long, weary days, only to be united afterward in the precious web by other workers who never saw its beginning."

Part lace may be identified by the ground or plaits being separate from the motifs and joined to them with knots. In continuous lace, the threads pass from the pattern into the ground and out again, without knots.

Bobbin tape lace is sometimes categorized as part lace.
