= Schneeberg lace =

Type of bobbin tape lace from Saxony

- Type: Lace
- Material: cotton
- Production method: Bobbin lace
- Production process: Craft production
- Place of origin: Ore Mountains, Germany
- Introduced: 20th century

Schneeberger (or Schneeberg) lace is a bobbin tape lace developed around 1915 in the Königliche Klöppelmuster Schule of Schneeberg in Ore Mountains Germany. With a small number of bobbins the typical small motifs could be produced quickly.

Lia Baumeister-Jonker, Schneeberger lace expert, describes the three characteristics of Schneeberger lace as:

- A tape lace that alternates between a small tape (1a worked in cloth stitch), and a wider tape (1b worked in whole stitch).
- Containing an outside plait.
- Containing fillings with plaits, with or without picots, leaf stitches or crescent shaped leaf stitches with picots and twisted pairs. Fillings are worked as they would be worked in Guipure lace.

Lacemakers can access technical assistance with characteristic features such as dips in the tapes, plaits with picots and handling corners to reproduce historical samples, or find modern designs from lace designers.

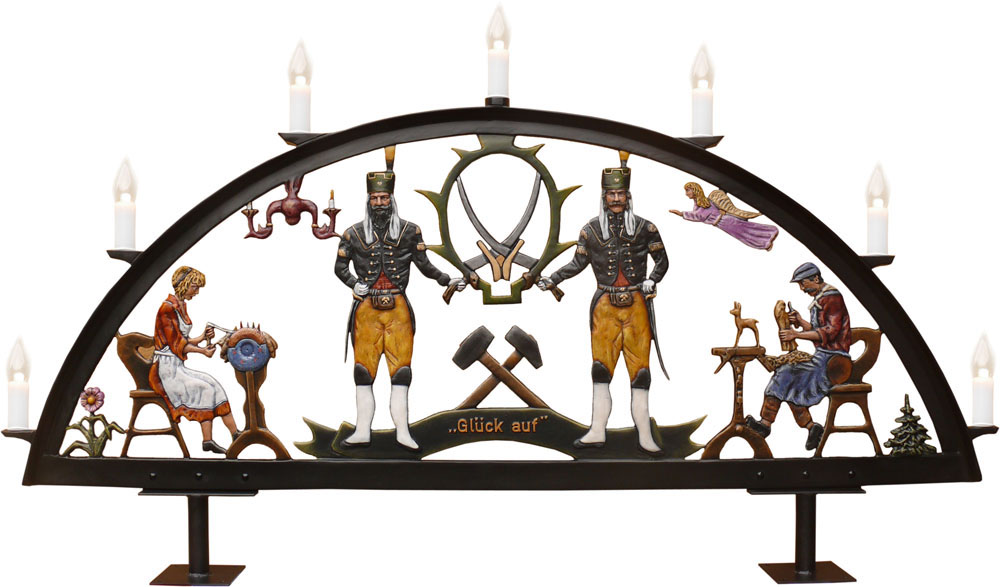
Lichterbogen Kunstguss Döhler

The Christmas decoration known as a Schwibbogen represents the lacemakers of the region in the wood carving silhouette original style.
