= Freehand lace =

Bobbin lace worked without a pricking

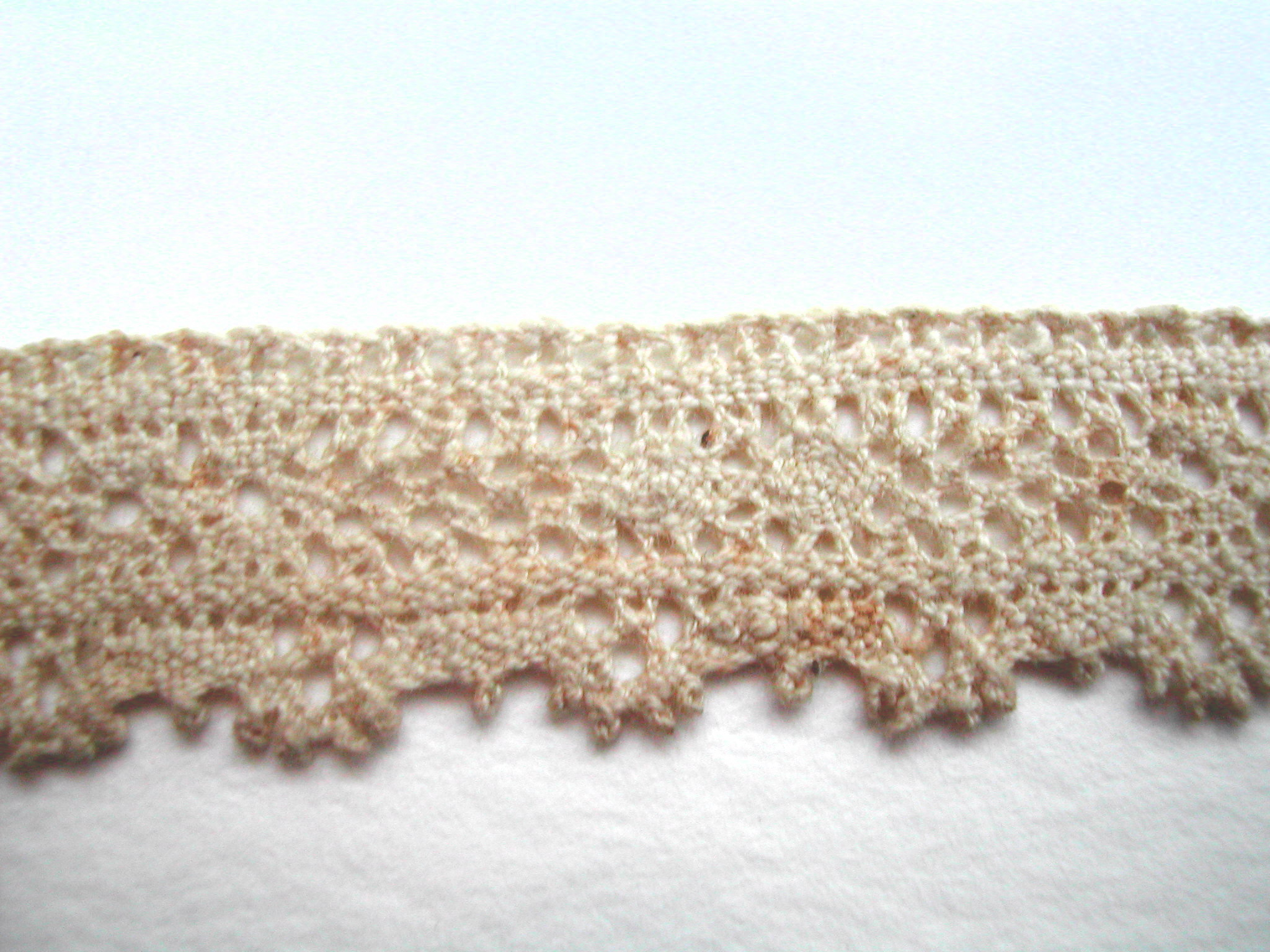
Freehand lace

Freehand lace is a bobbin lace that works directly on the fabric of the lace pillow without using a pricked pattern. Very few pins are needed for this technique (in most cases, only at the two edges.)

The very early bobbin laces were probably made freehand, as pins were scarce, coarse, and expensive. At first, the laces were purely utilitarian: “seaming” laces (insertions) joining narrow widths of fabric, and toothed or scalloped laces reinforcing the edges (edgings). Many of the later freehand laces were also functional, but some areas produced very wide ornamental laces.

Traces of freehand lace can be found nearly everywhere as they were part of the textiles produced in pre-industrial communities. However, production only survived in a few places, often because the lace was sold through handicraft organizations when it no longer adorned the peasant costume and household textiles.

There are a few areas with a living tradition, like Dalarna and Skåne in Sweden, several areas in Slovakia, Cogne and Pescocostanzo in Italy, and Mikhailov in Russia. The Queyras region of France has lace practitioners of this style.

Freehand lace is dense compared to lace made on a pattern. Wide areas without pins can be constructed by using certain techniques: the different parts of the lace must be made in the right order, and a triple half stitch can be used to secure the threads instead of a pin.

In many areas, the laces are made wider by combining two or more patterns lengthwise. The lengths of the repeats are usually quite different.

Many other laces have traits inherited from freehand lace, for example, the patterns and the working of the braids in Milanese lace, and the grounds without pins, and the exchange of workers in linen stitch in some of the Flemish laces.

The term 'freehand lace' was first used as the translation of an Italian term in the English edition (1913) of Elisa Ricci's Antiche Trine Italiane. It is called 'lace without a pattern' in French, and 'numeric lace' in Russian, and the Slovaks have named it by the fact that it is produced on a bare pillow. In Swedish, the verb used for composing a poem is also used for making freehand lace.

The basic research on Freehand Lace was made by Bodil Tornehave of Denmark, and published in her book Danske Frihåndskniplinger (ISBN 87-7490-291-1, Danish Freehand Lace) in 1987.

'Freehand lace' is sometimes confused with 'free lace', which is a modern, artistic form of lace.
