= Milanese bobbin lace =

Style of historical bobbin lace developed in Milan

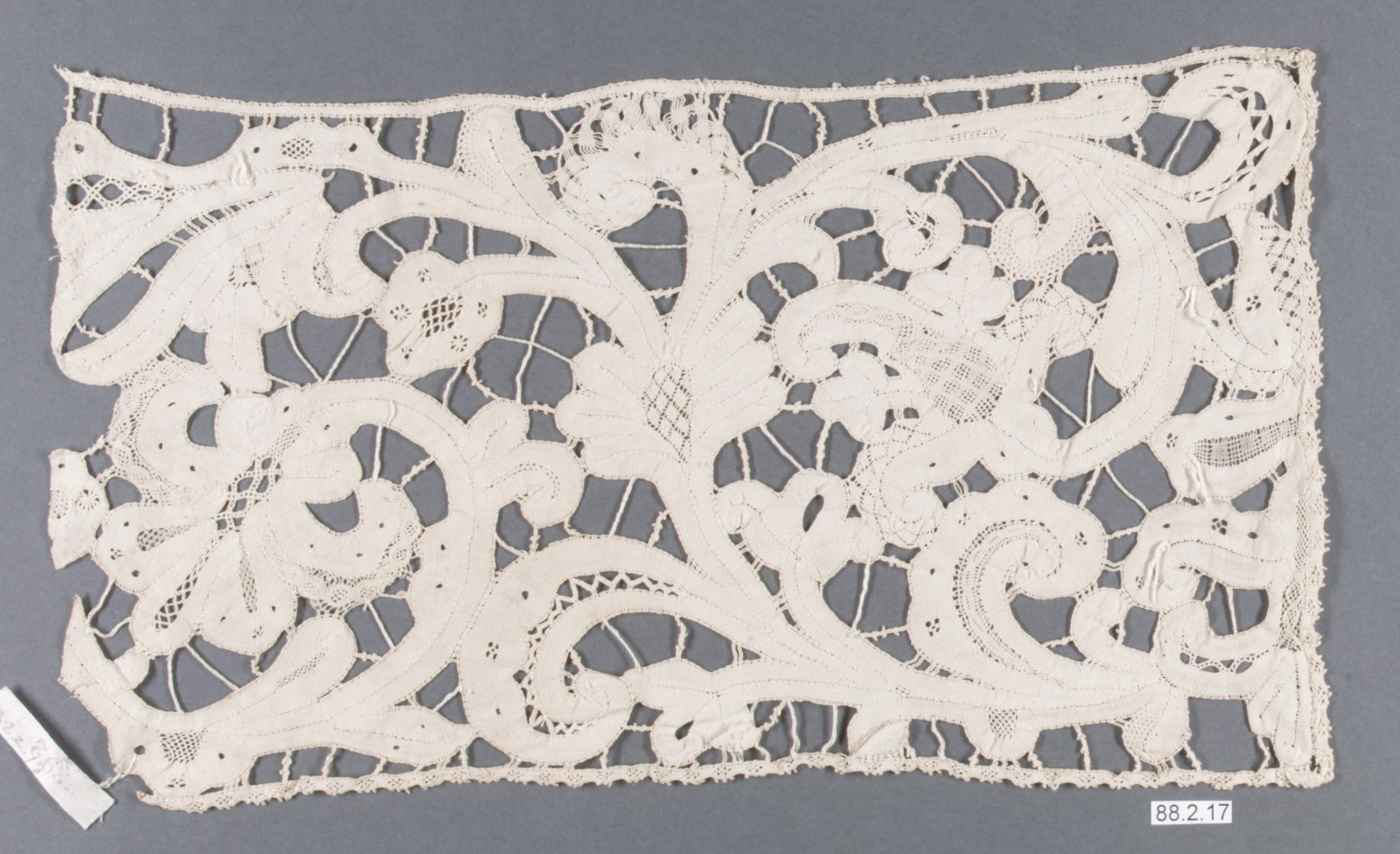
Fragment of Milanese bobbin lace, dating from the 17th century

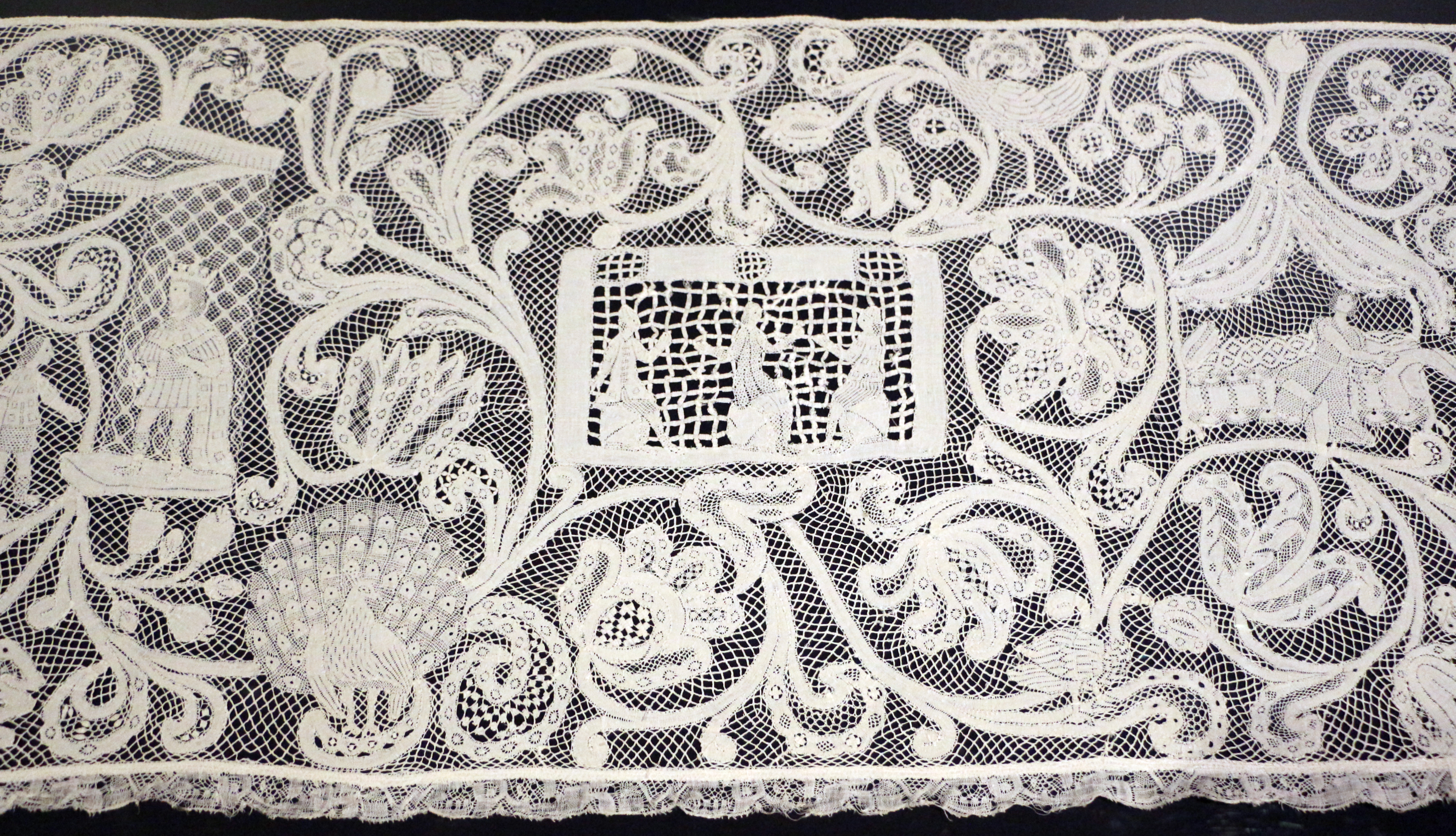
Milano, bobina di pizzo per balza da camice, in punto di milano, 1650-1700 ca. 02

Milanese bobbin lace is a textile used as a fashion accessory or a decorative trim, first becoming popular in the 17th and 18th centuries in Milan. Lacemaking was an important economic activity in Northern Italy, besides touching on social status matters as well as being a culturally significant art form. The earliest versions of the lace consisted of the tape (or braid) mostly filling the space. Typical characteristics of Milanese bobbin lace are scrolls made with curving clothwork tapes and floral motifs, and sometimes also consisting of human or animal figures. Sometimes needle lace techniques were combined with the bobbin lace pieces to create the final product.

The lace eventually was made in parts, and joined by bars or filled in with mesh grounds between existing pattern motifs. Novel ornamental features such as small beads affixed for eyes are sometimes found, as well as folded tallies and wheatears that add dimension to figures or edges.

Use of the lace in Ecclesiastical settings such as altar cloths and vestments likely represented Church support of the regional lacemaking. Examples of chalice cloths display the lace as edging, for example. Additionally, larger flounces might relate Biblical tales such as the example of the Old Testament story of Joseph, with many human, animal, and even astronomical motifs. Fashion uses, such as collars and cuffs, have also been documented.

Commissions of lace by wealthy patrons for weddings or other notable occasions might include family coat-of-arms displayed in the lace.

After the early Milanese laces from Milan developed, using less refined linen threads, a tape or braid style lace also arose in Flanders in the 17th century. The Flemish lace had much similarity to the Italian version, but typically worked with finer flax thread. It is sometimes difficult to distinguish the styles, and today they are considered to be under the Milanese name in a generic way.

Lacemaking has continued through the centuries, adapting to later fashion styles and other influences. The original styles are said to have influenced the tape laces of eastern European styles such as Russian, Hungarian, and Slovak laces. Milanese lace continues to be made today with nods to historical tapes and other motifs but with new artistic formats such as the work of Louise Colgan and colorways reminiscent of watercolors by Sandi Woods. Although there may be controversy over the use of color, patterns relying on thread color are available. Instructional pattern books make the recreation of the traditional laces possible for lacemakers today, as well as expanding the range into contemporary styles. Other textile artists also expand the fiber choices and colors with larger patterns and designs. Some modern Milanese lacemakers have adopted the rolled edge technique from laces in the Withof or Duchesse family as a finishing process.

== Gallery ==
18th century Milanese lace depicting biblical story of Joseph

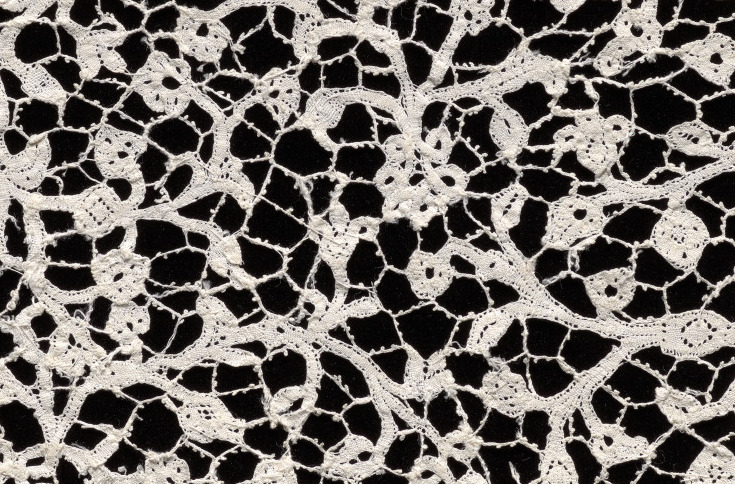
Bobbin Lace (Bride Ground) Border 504.1915.c (detail)

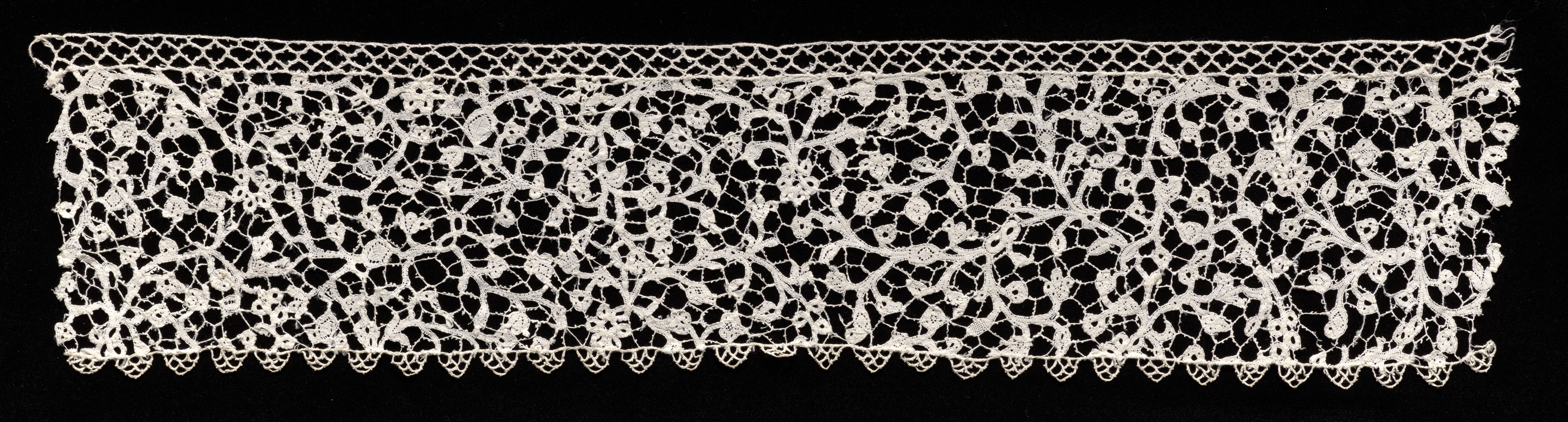
Bobbin Lace (Bride Ground) Border 504.1915.c

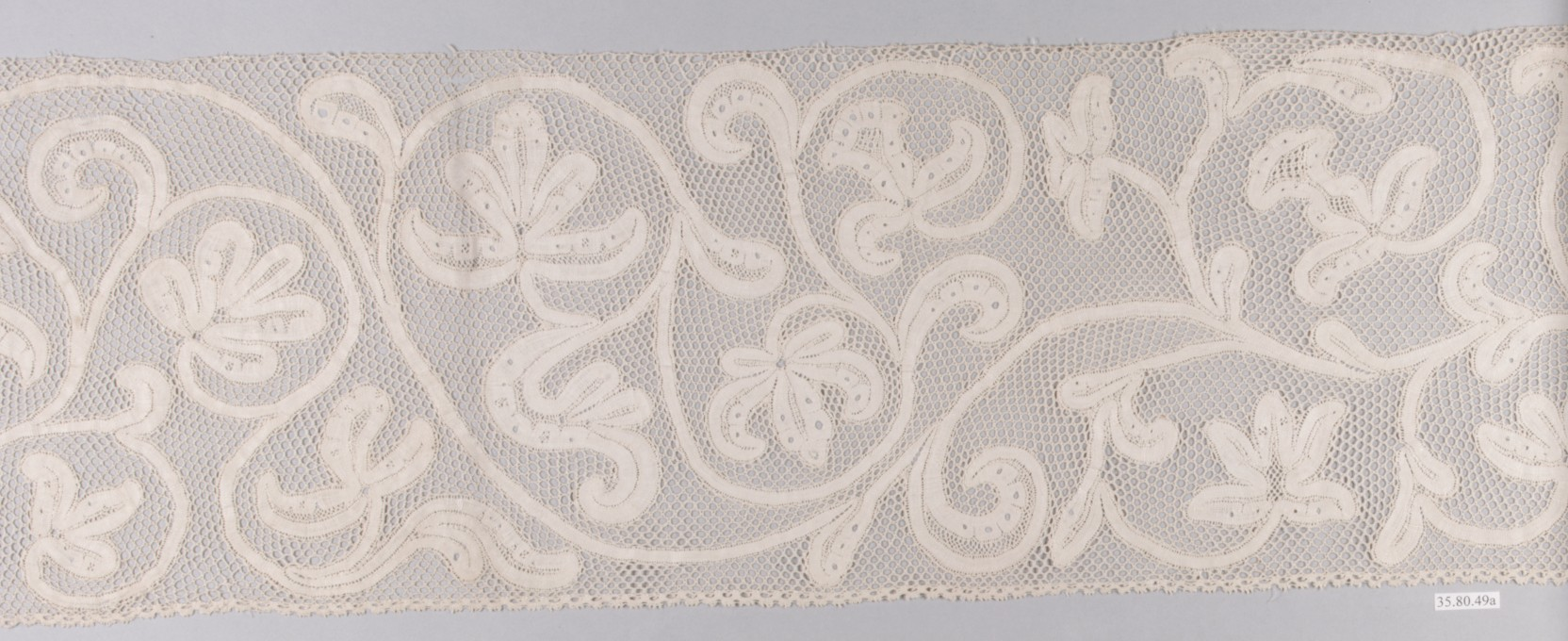
Fragment of Milanese bobbin lace, dating from the 18th century

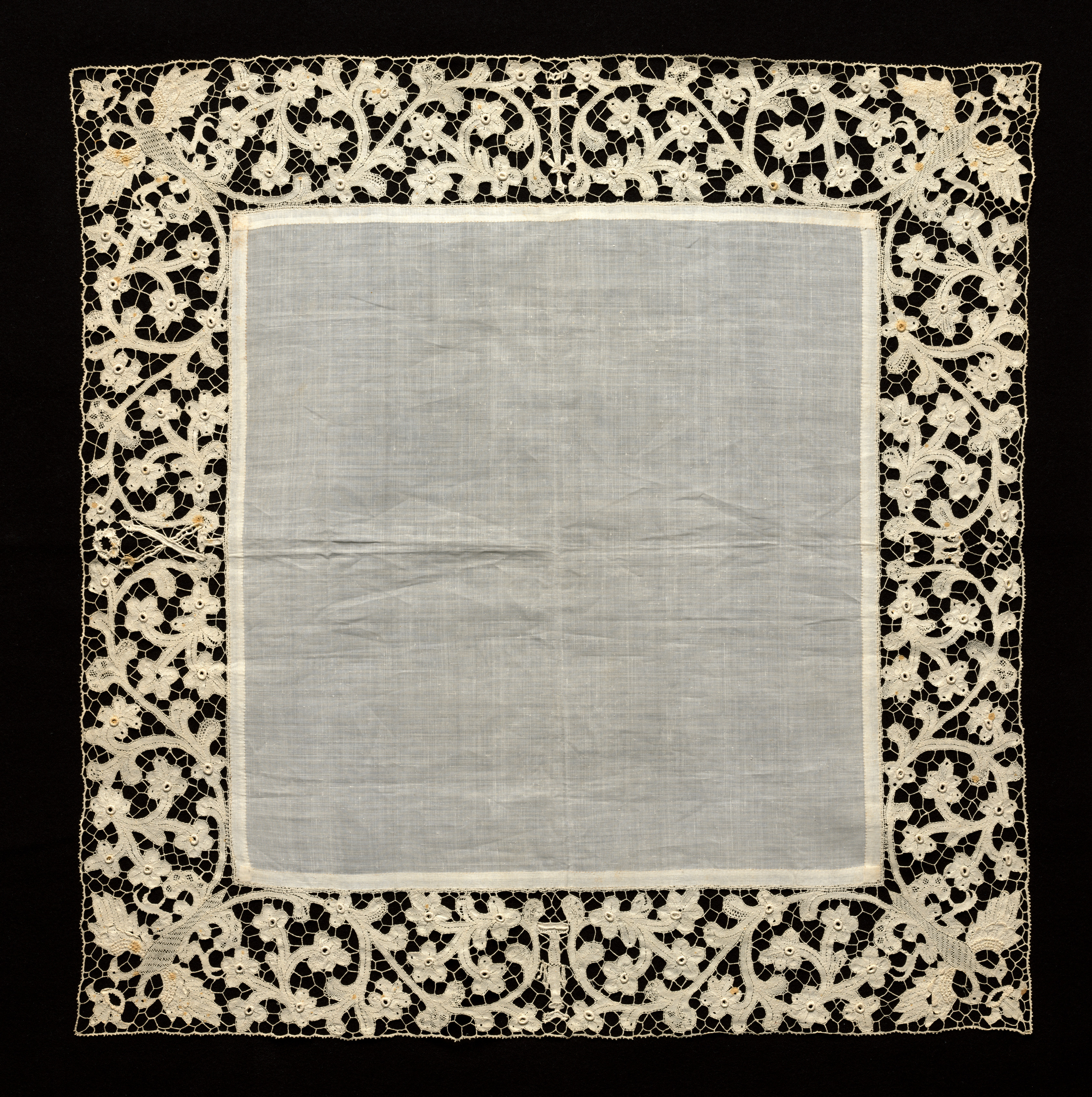
Chalice Veil - Cleveland Museum of Art

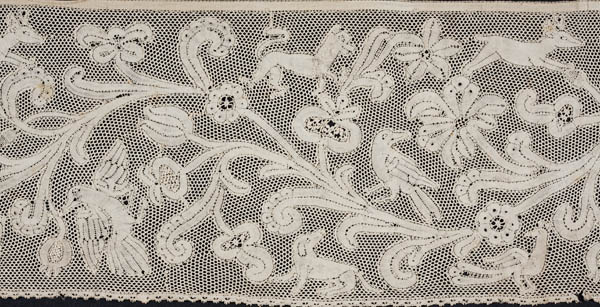
Wide edging lace, Italy, Milan, 17th century, HAA

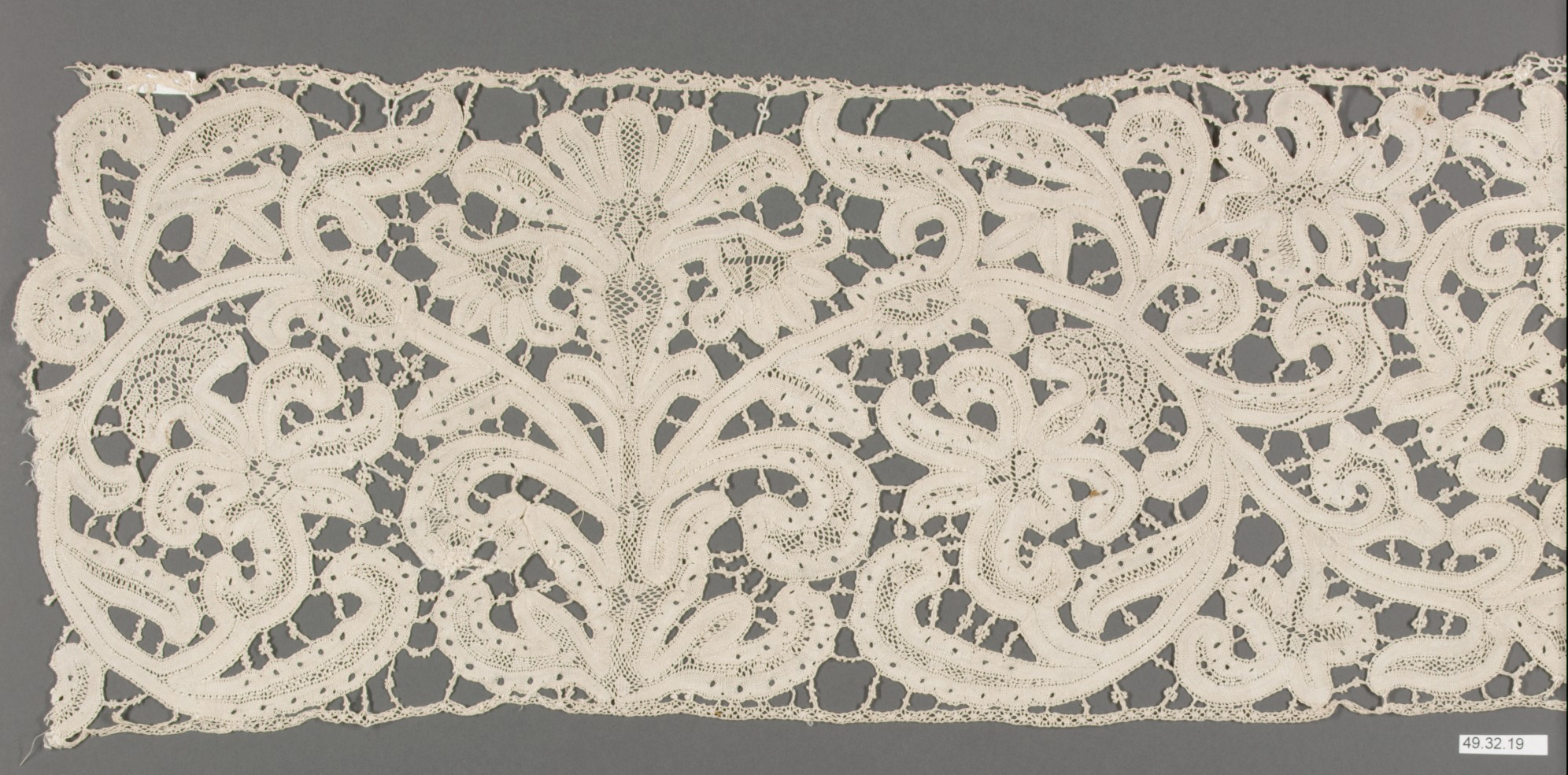
Insertion MET DP5481 49.32.19

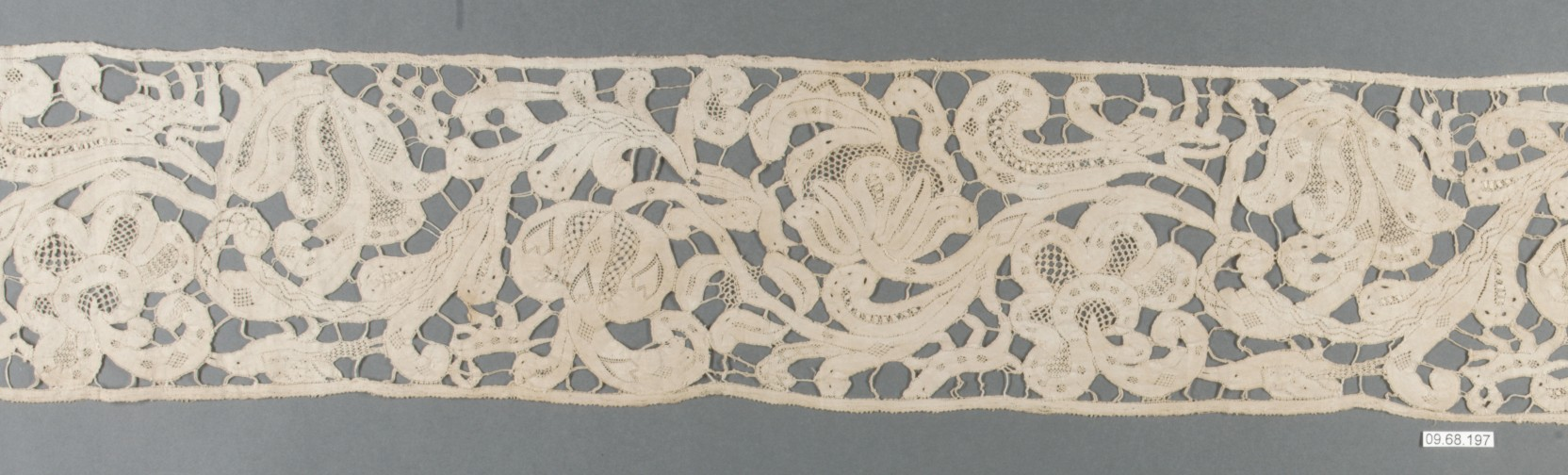
Strip MET DP16313 09.68.197

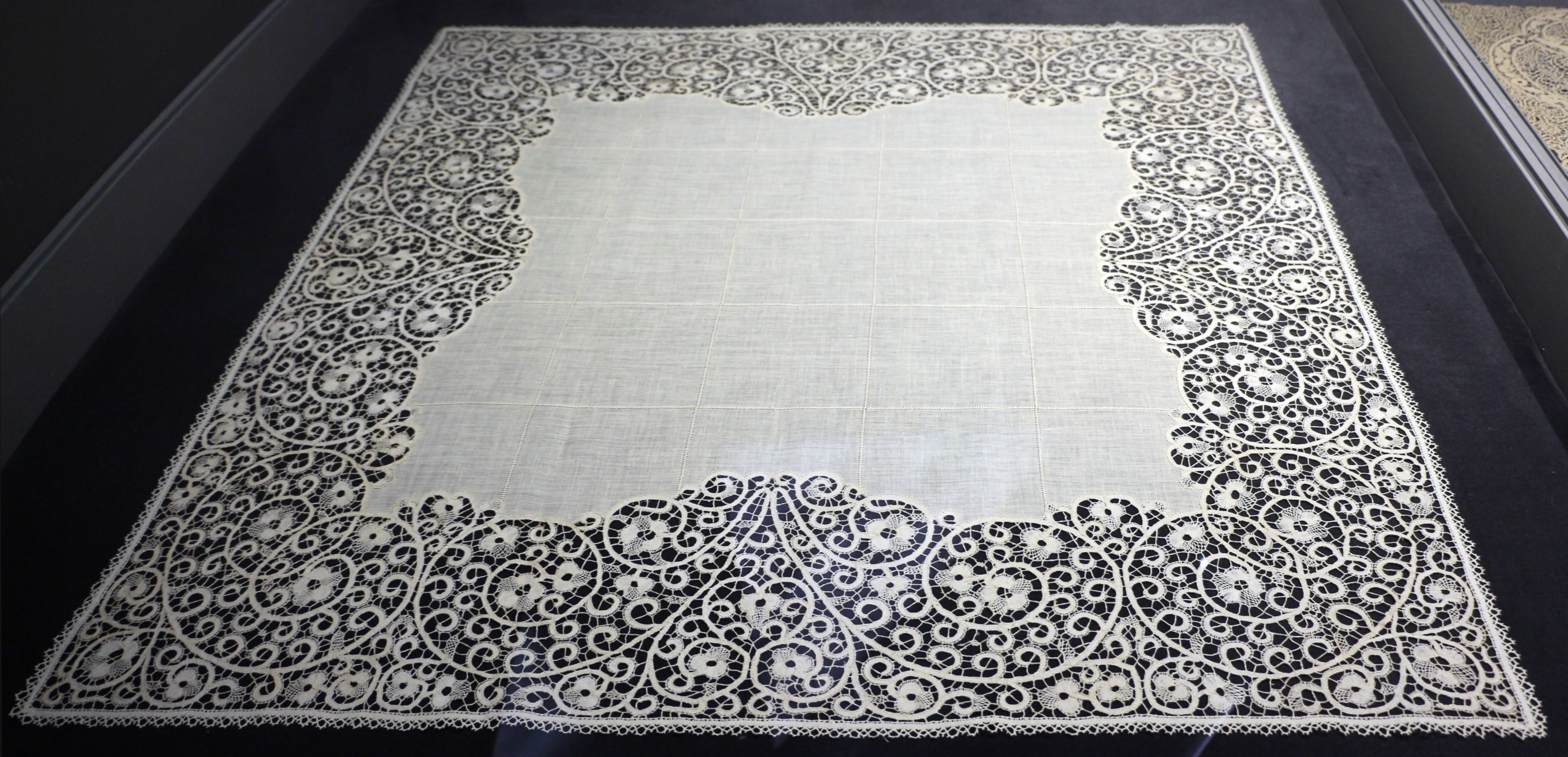
Manifattura canturina, tovaglie da the, 1925-50 ca. 02

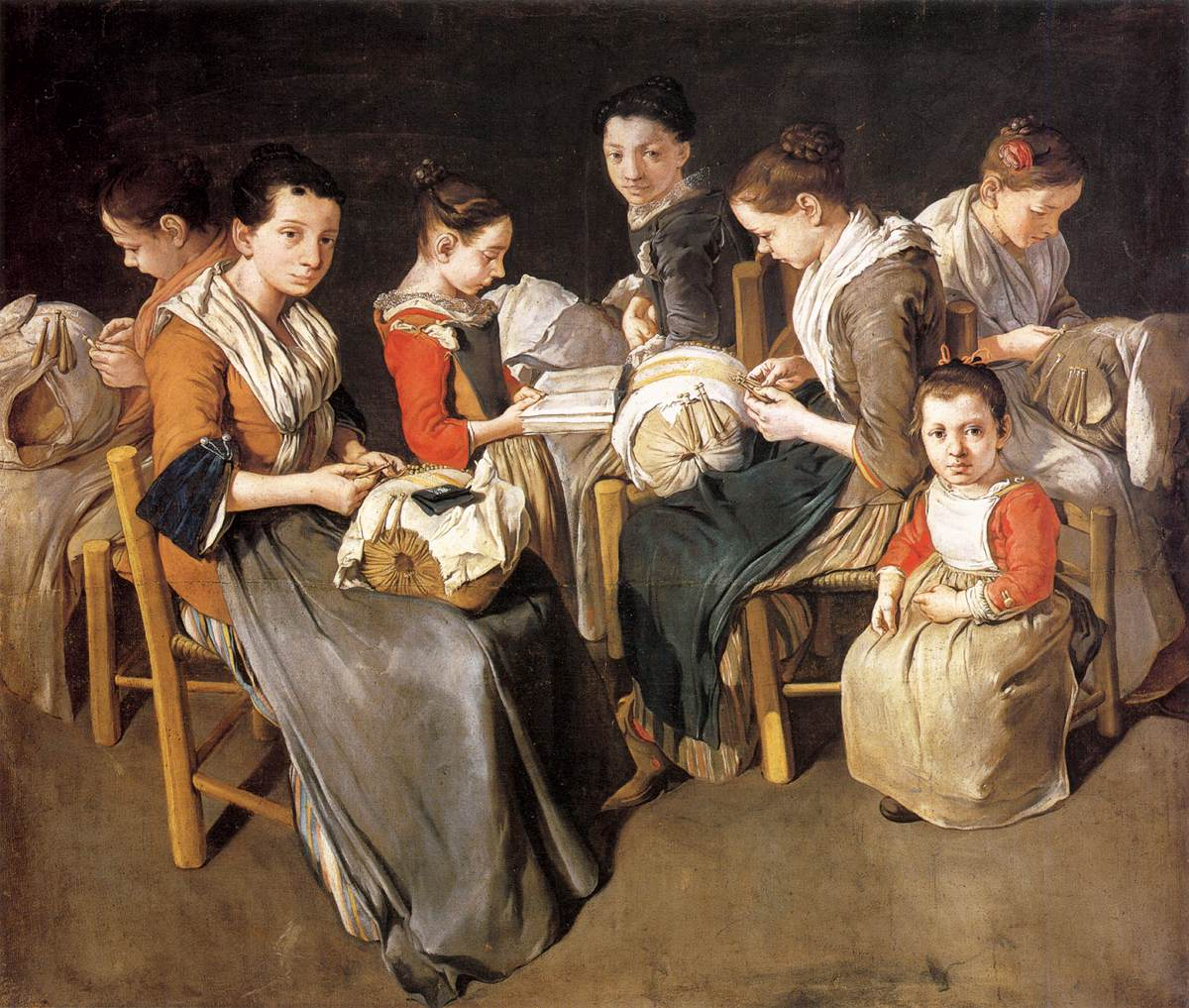
Giacomo Ceruti - Women Working on Pillow Lace (The Sewing School)
