= Russian lace =

Types of bobbin tape lace from Russia

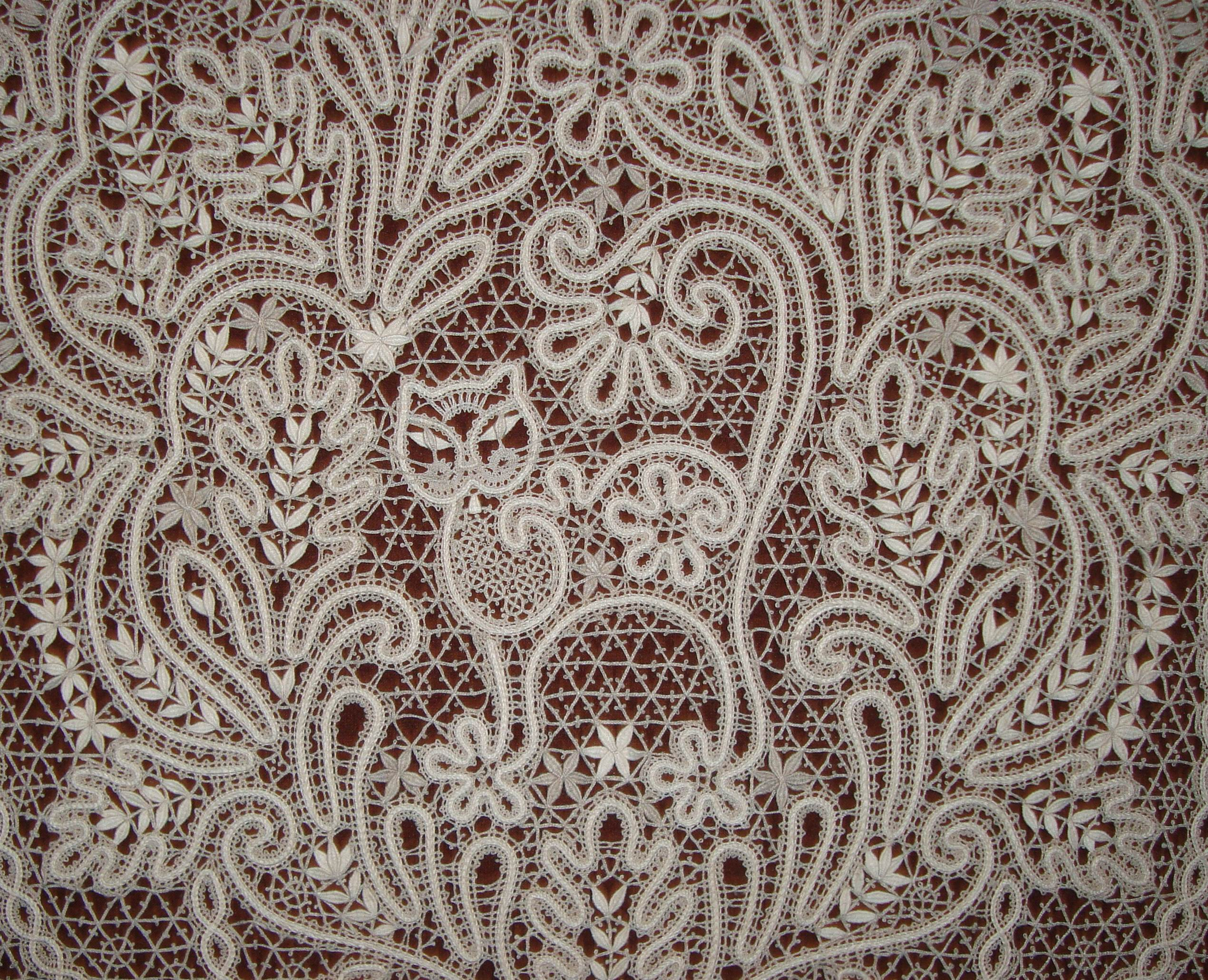
Fragment of lace "Lukomorie" based on by Alexander Pushkin's poem Ruslan and Ludmila

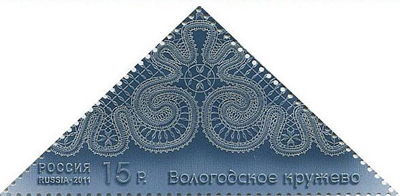
Russia stamp 2011 № 1551

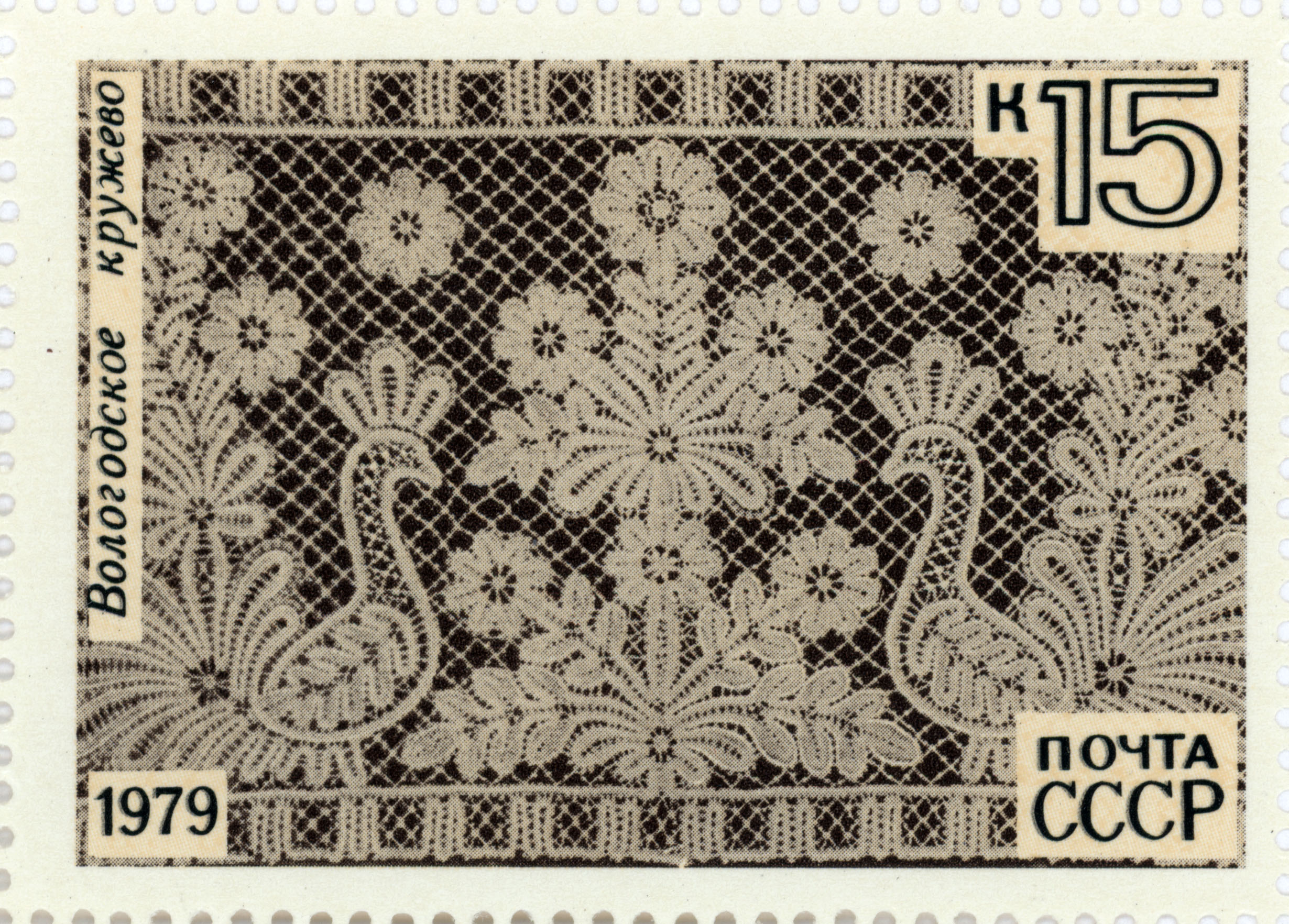
1979 CPA 4971

Russian lace is a bobbin tape lace. The tape is made with bobbins at the same time as the rest of the lace, curving back on itself, and joined using a crochet hook. It was made in Russia, but similar laces made elsewhere are also called Russian lace.

The designs of Russian lace are of abstract form. The narrow tapes or trails follow a maze-like path through deep scallops to merge again and wander into the next. Examples of many regional styles and examples are available in scholarly works, and instructional materials have also been published with typical stitches.

Types of Russian Lace:

Vologda lace

Yelets lace

Mtsensk lace

Kalyazin lace

Torzhok lace

Ryazan Lace

Skopin Lace

Mikhailov Lace

Yaroslavl lace

Kostroma lace

Vyatka lace

Kukarskoe lace

Belevsky Lace

Odoevsky Lace

Nizhny Novgorod lace

== Gallery ==
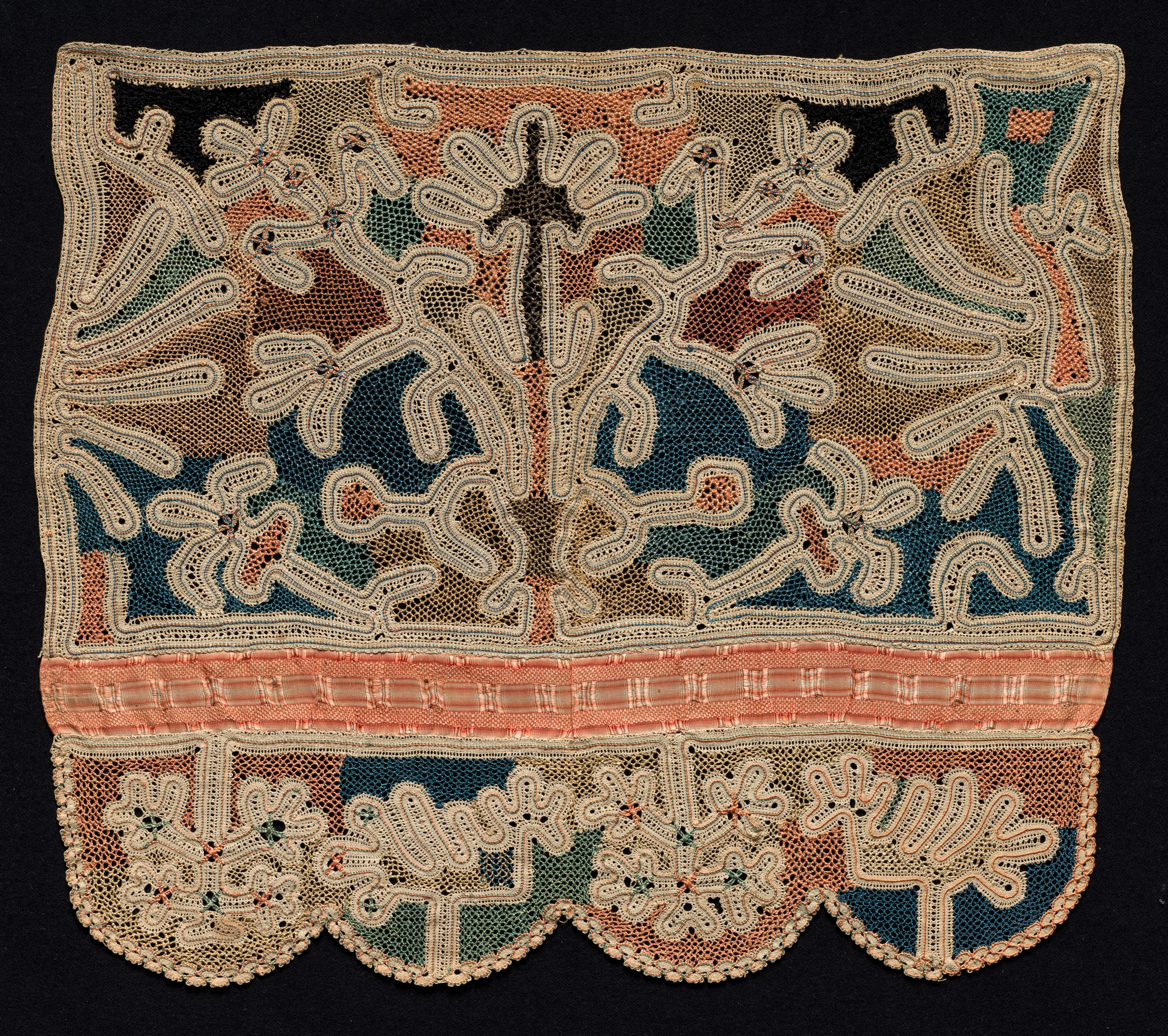
Unknown artist - Towel End - Cleveland Museum of Art

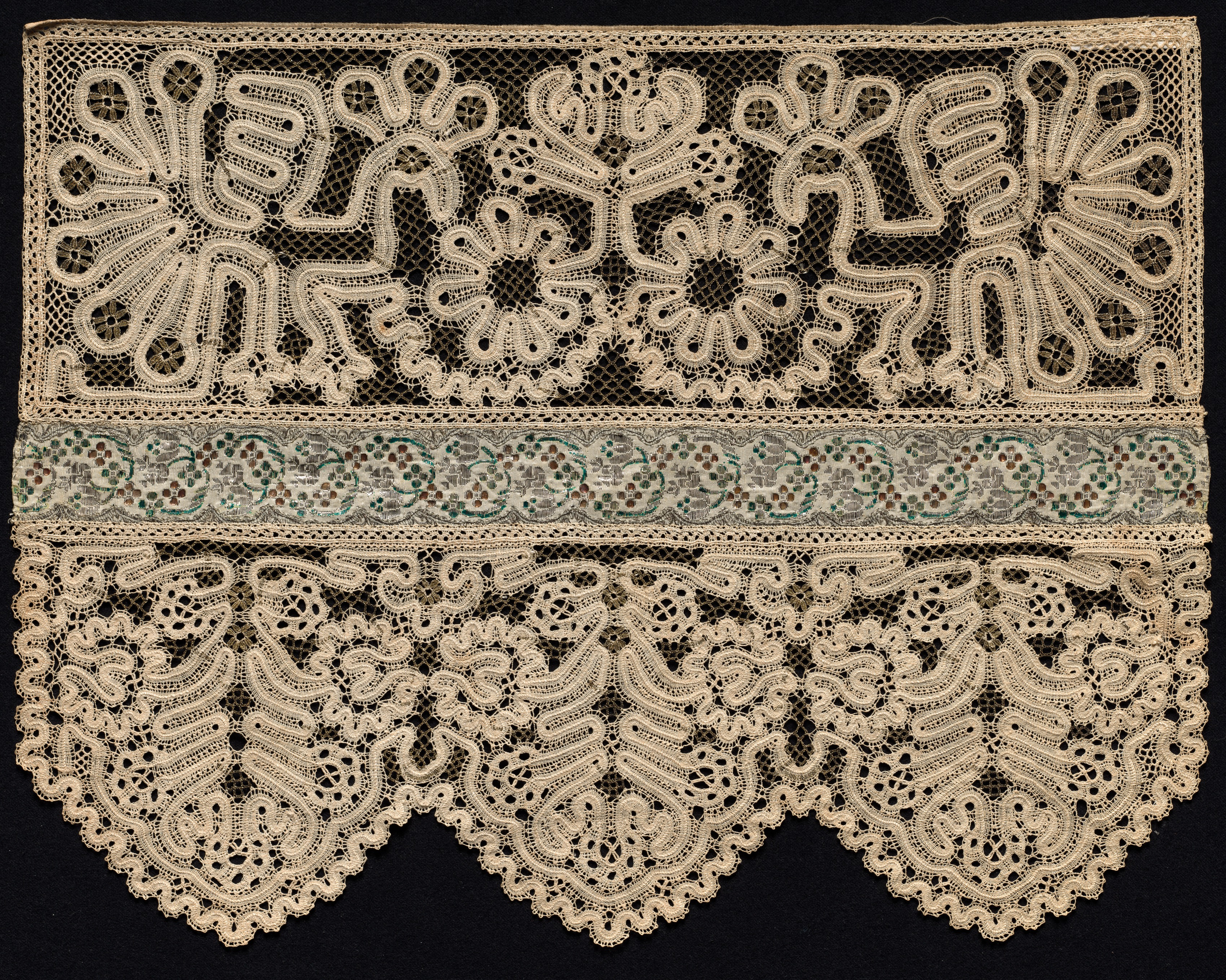
Unknown artist - Towel End - Cleveland Museum of Art

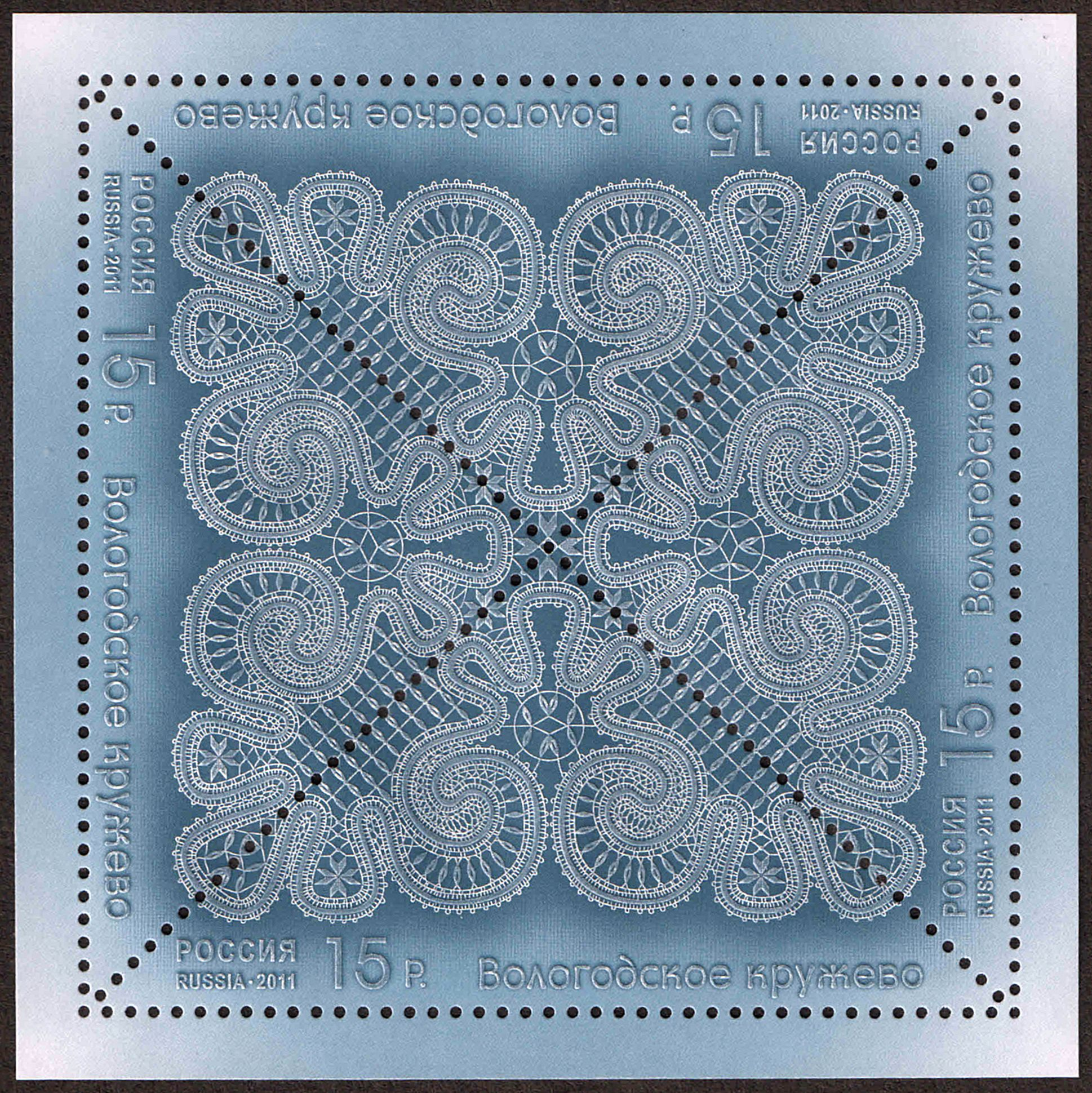
Russian stamp showing Vologda lace

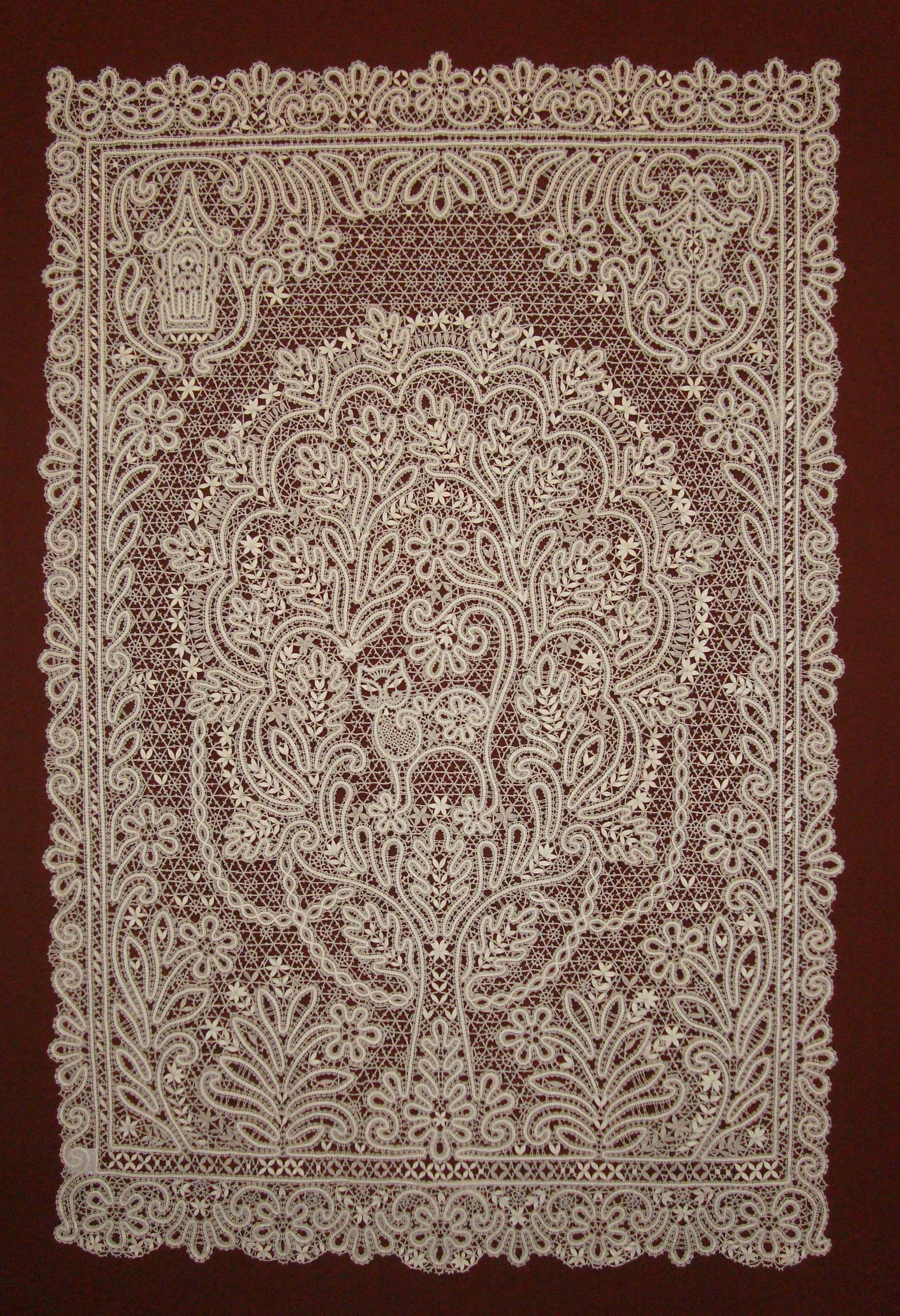
Vologda (Lukomorie)

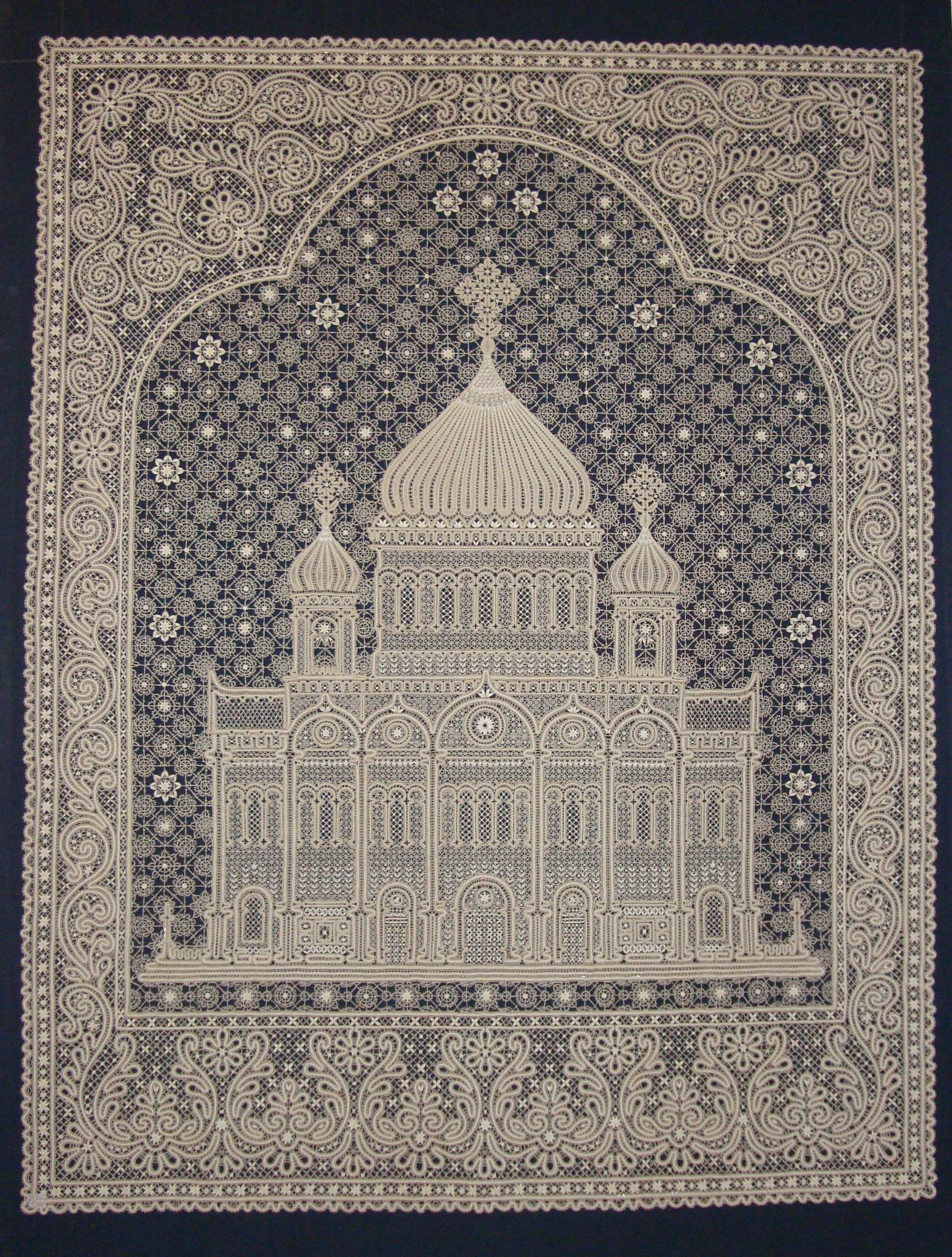
Vologda

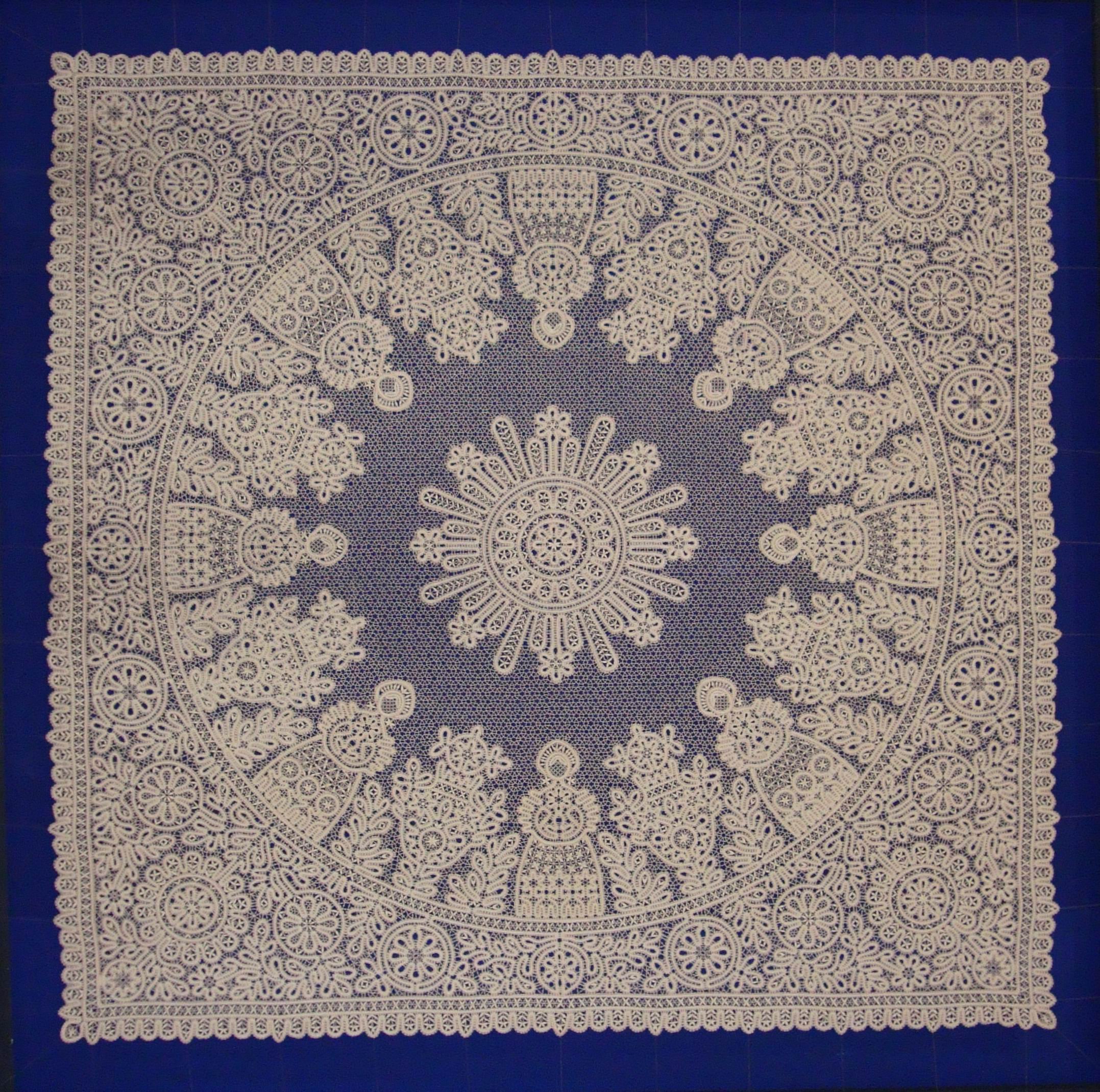
Vologda

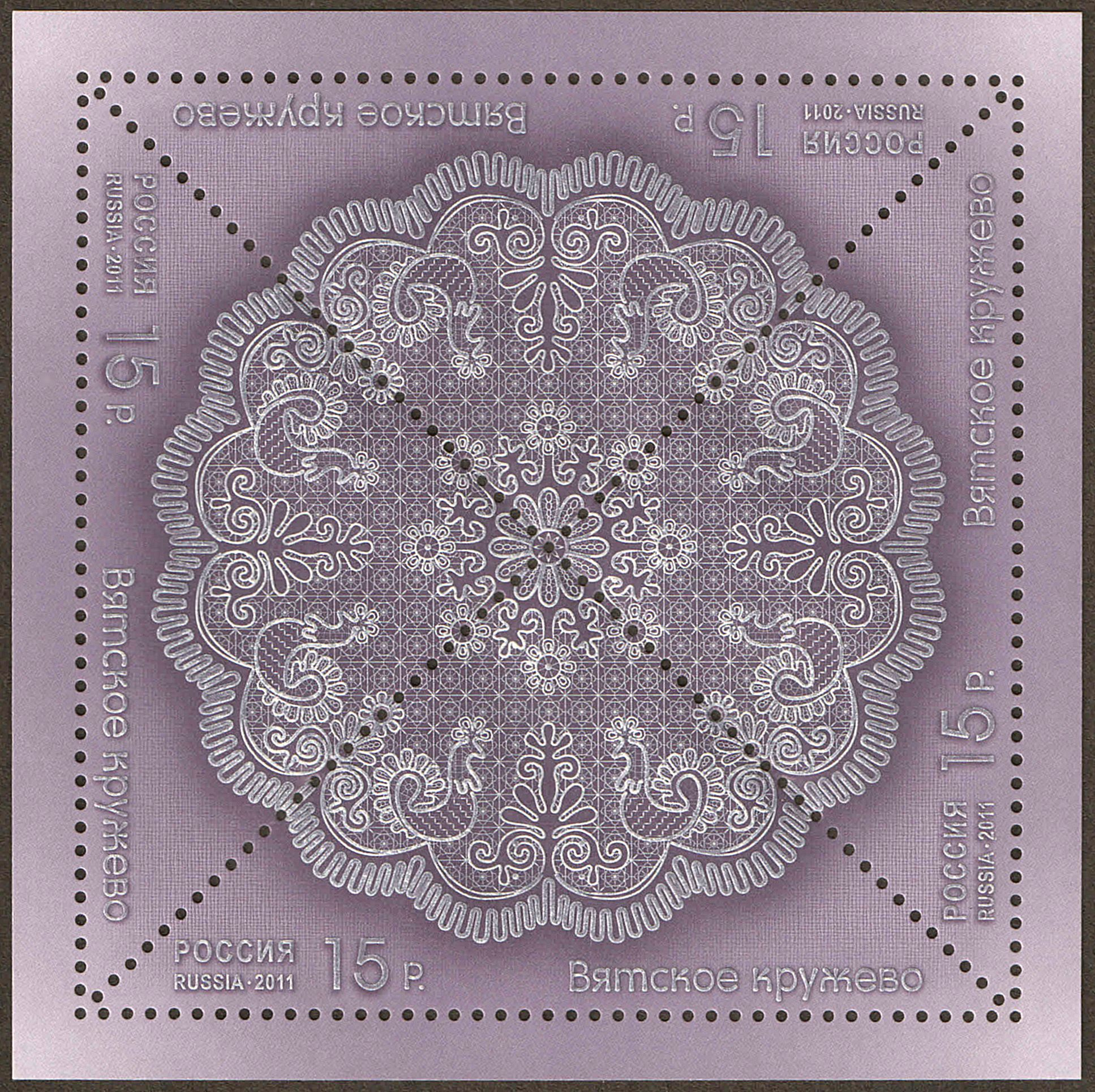
Russian stamp showing Vyatka lace

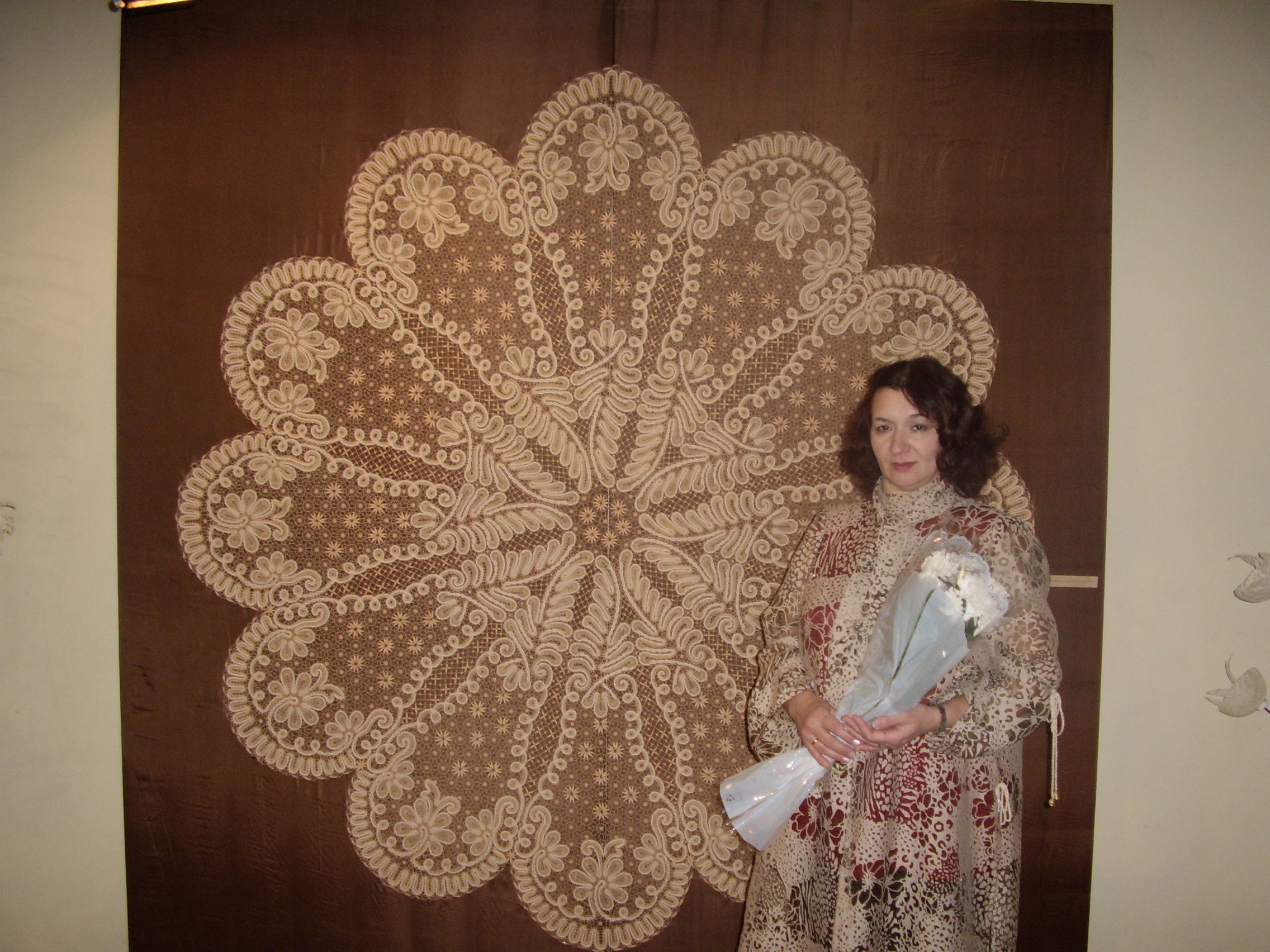
Vyatskoe

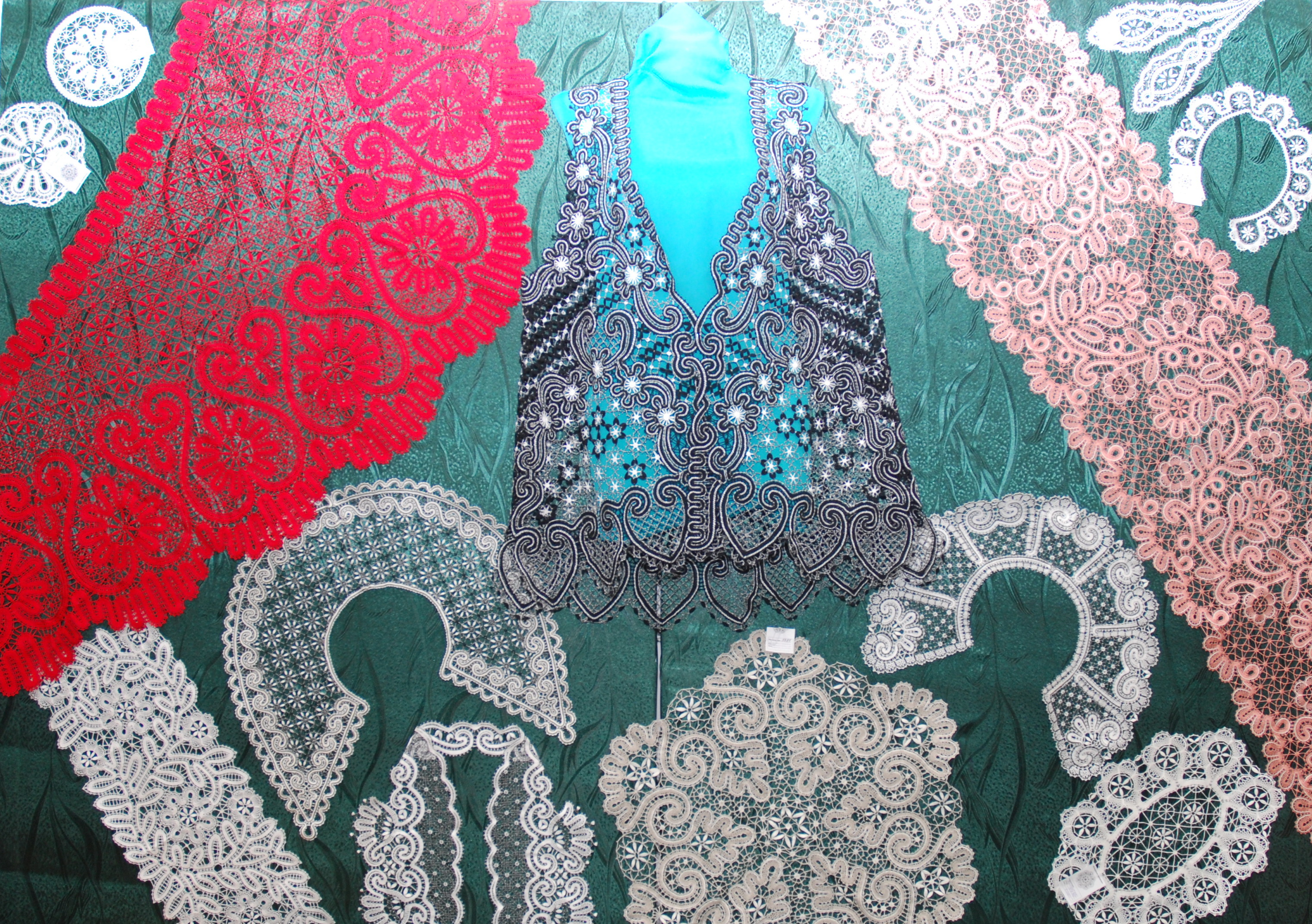
Kukarskaya
