= Reed (weaving) =

Part of loom

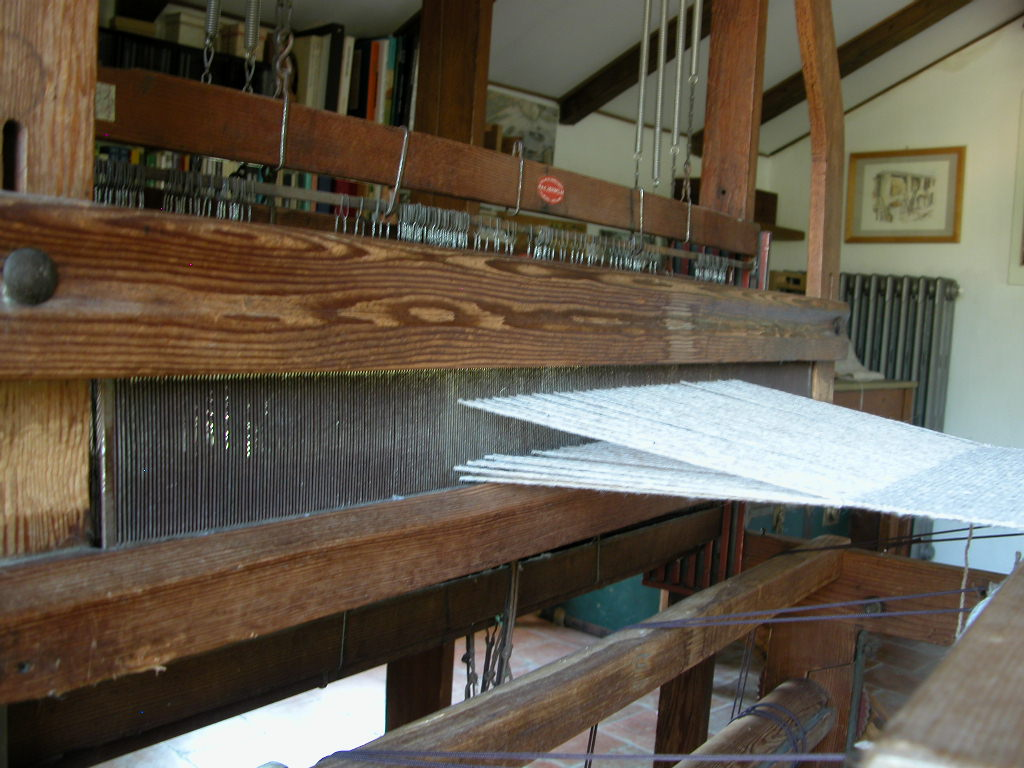
The reed is the part in the beater that the warp threads go through.

Weaving on a floor loom, using a beater that swings, suspended on a heavy wood frame.

A reed is part of a weaving loom, and resembles a comb or a frame with many vertical slits. It is used to separate and space the warp threads, to guide the shuttle's motion across the loom, and to push the weft threads into place. In most floor looms with, the reed is securely held by the beater. Floor looms and mechanized looms both use a beater with a reed, whereas Inkle weaving and tablet weaving do not use reeds.

== History ==
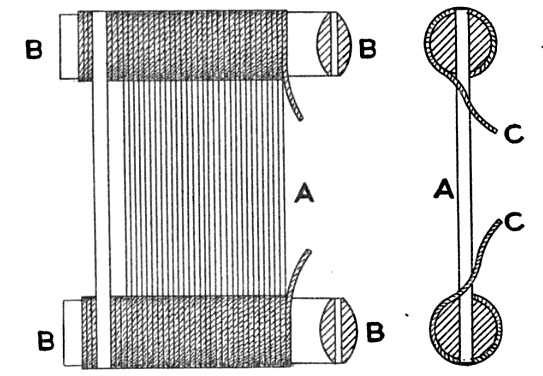
A: wires or dents B: wooden ribs C: tarred cord

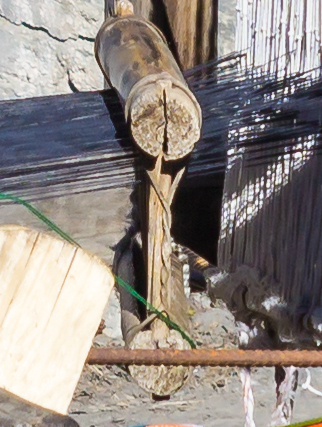
End view of a traditional reed made of reeds or cane.

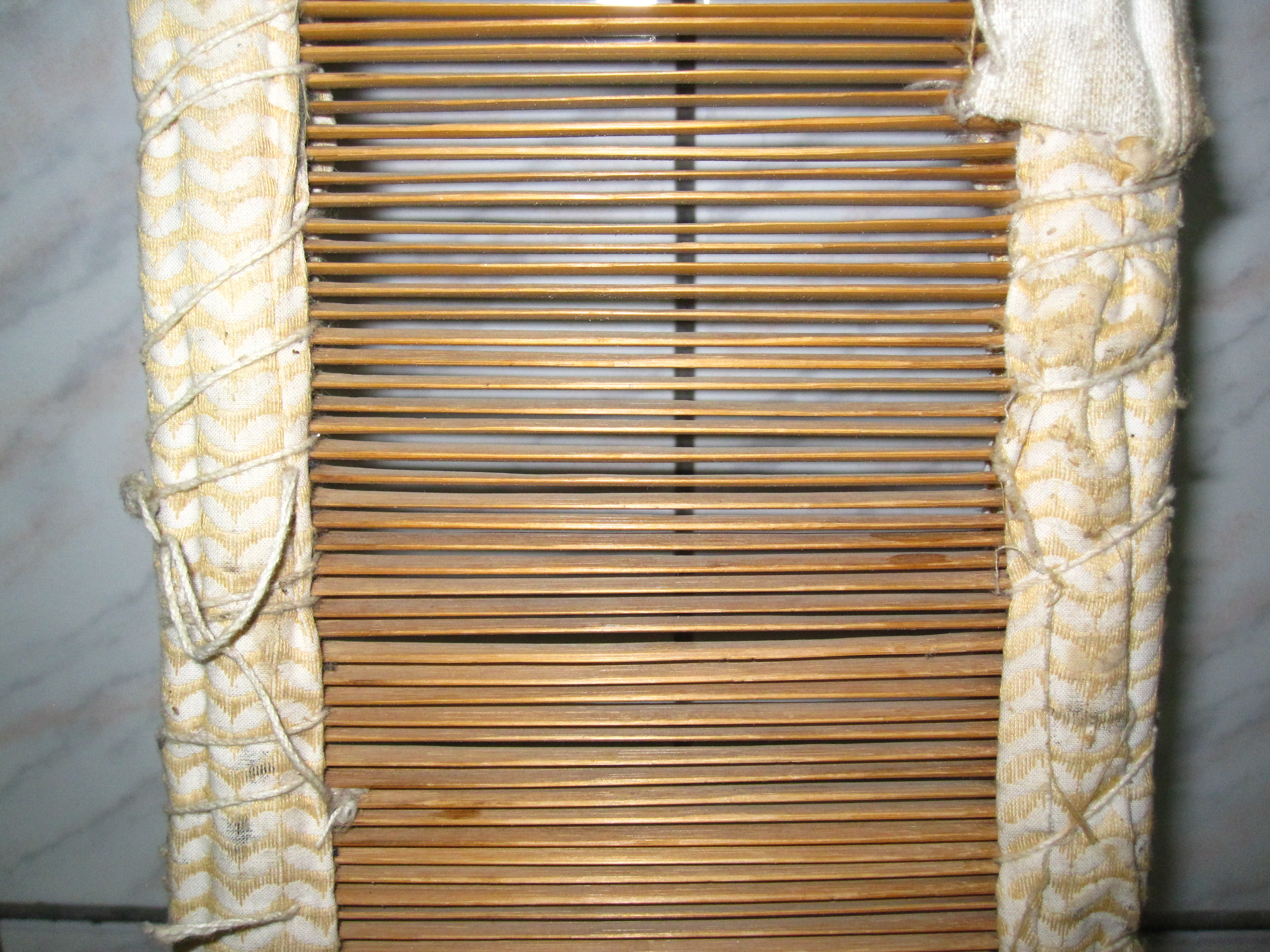
A side view

Modern reeds are made by placing flattened strips of wire (made of carbon or stainless steel) between two half round ribs of wood, and binding the whole together with tarred string.

Historically, reeds were made of reed or split cane. The split cane was then bound between ribs of wood in the same manner as wire is now.

In 1738, John Kay replaced split cane with flattened iron or brass wire, and the change was quickly adopted.

To make a reed, wire is flattened to a uniform thickness by passing it between rollers. The flat wire is then straightened, given rounded edges, and filed smooth. The final step is to cut the wire to the correct length and assemble. The tarred cord that binds the reed together is wrapped around each set of wooden ribs and between the dents to hold the ribs together and at the correct spacing.

The length of the metal wire varies depending on the type of fabric and the type of loom being used. For a machine-powered cotton loom, the metal wires are commonly 3.5 inches (89 mm) long. For hand-powered floor looms, around 4 inches (100 mm) is common.

== Dents ==
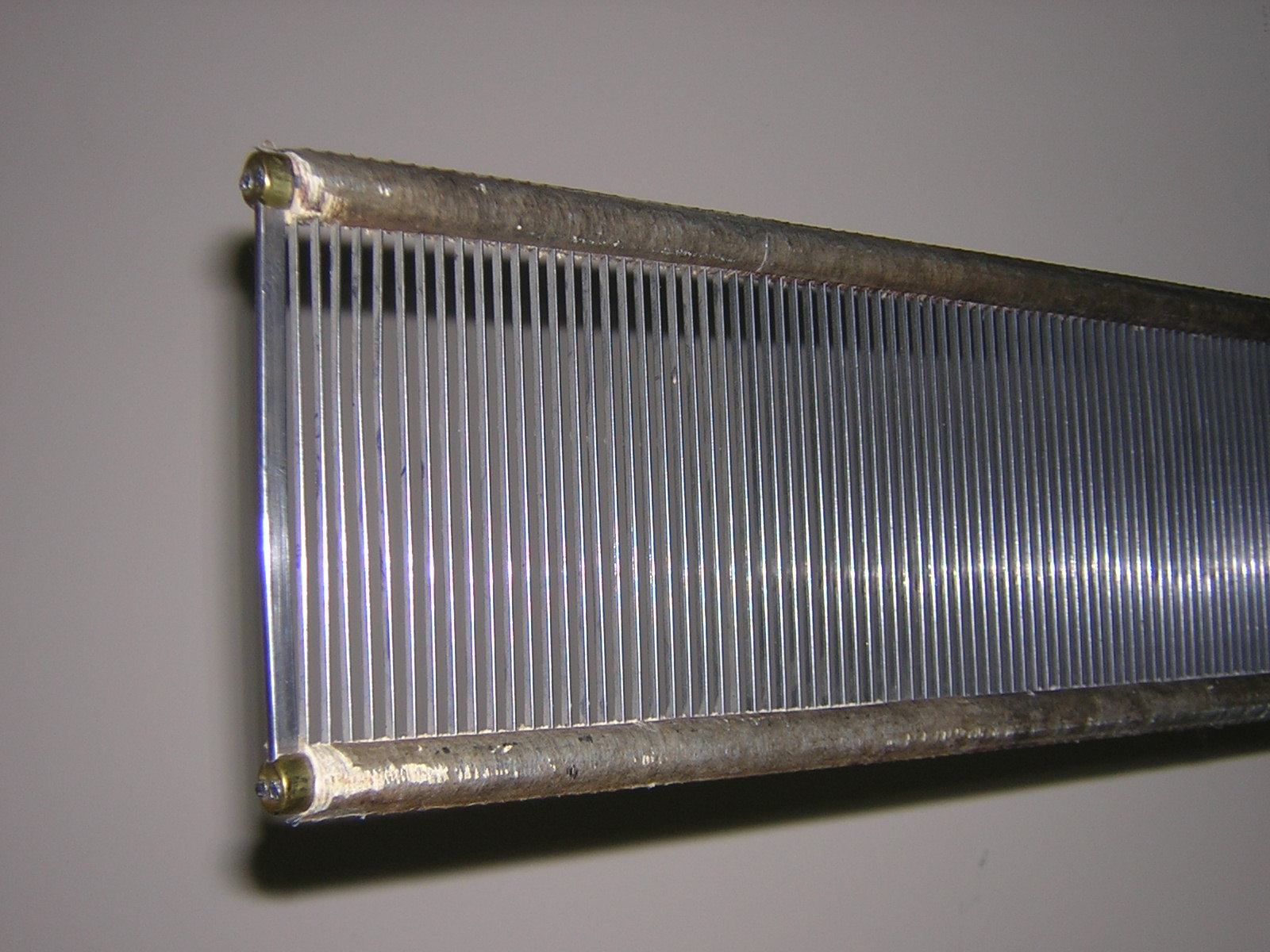
A metal reed on end

Both the wires and the slots in the reed are known as dents (namely, teeth). The warp threads pass through the dents after going through the heddles and before becoming woven cloth. The number of dents per inch (or per cm or per 10 cm) indicates the number of gaps in the reed per linear width. The number of warp thread ends by weaving width determines the fineness of the cloth. One or more warp threads may pass through each dent. The number of warp threads that go through each dent depends on the warp and the desired characteristics of the final fabric, and it is possible that the number of threads in each dent is not constant for a whole warp. The number of threads per dent might not be constant if the weaver alternates 2 and three threads per dent, in order to get a number of ends per inch that is 2.5 times the number of dents per inch, or if the thickness of the warp threads were to change at that point, and the fabric to have a thicker or thinner section.

One thread per dent is most common for coarse work. However for finer work (20 or more ends per inch), two or more threads are put through each dent. Threads can be doubled in every other space, so that a reed with 10 dents per inch could give 15 ends per inch, or 20 if the threads were simply doubled. Also, threads can be put in every other dent so as to make a cloth with 6 ends per inch from a reed with 12 dents per inch. Putting more than one thread through each dent reduces friction and the number of reeds that one weaver needs, and is used in weaving mills. If too many threads are put through one dent there may be reed marks left in the fabric, especially in linen and cotton.

For cotton fabrics, reeds typically have between 6 and 90 dents per inch. When the reed has a very high number of dents per inch, it may contain two offset rows of wires. This minimizes friction between the dents and warp threads and prevents loose fibers from twisting and blocking the shed.

== Interchangeability ==
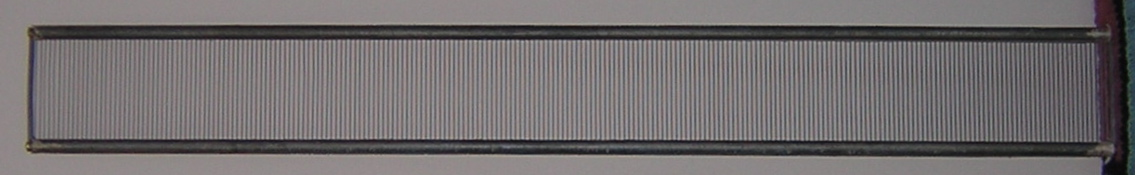
A reed with 5 dents per inch, separate from the loom

Handweaving looms (including floor and table looms) use interchangeable reeds, where the reeds can vary in width and dents per inch. This allows the same loom to be used for making both very fine and very coarse fabric, as well as weaving threads at dramatically different densities.

The width of the reed sets the maximum width of the warp.

Common reed sizes for the hand-weaver are 6, 8, 10, 12, or 15 dents per inch, although sizes between 5 and 24 are not uncommon. A reed with a larger number of dents per inch is generally used to weave finer fabric with a larger number of ends per inch. Because it is used to beat the weft into place, the reed regulates the distance between threads or groups of threads.

== Sleying the reed ==
Drawing in through the heddles, and sleying the reed (latter starts at ~50 seconds in)

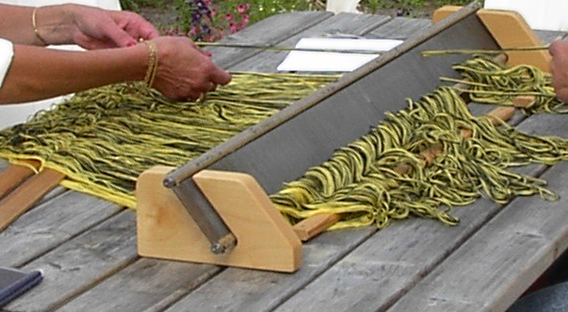
Sleying a reed with coarser yarn

Sleying is the term used for pulling the warp threads through the reed, which happens during the warping process (putting a warp on the loom). Sleying is done by inserting a reed hook through the reed, hooking the warp threads and then pulling them through the dent. The warp threads are taken in the order they come from the heddles, so as to avoid crossing threads. If the threads cross, the shed will not open correctly when weaving begins.

== Use in cooking ==
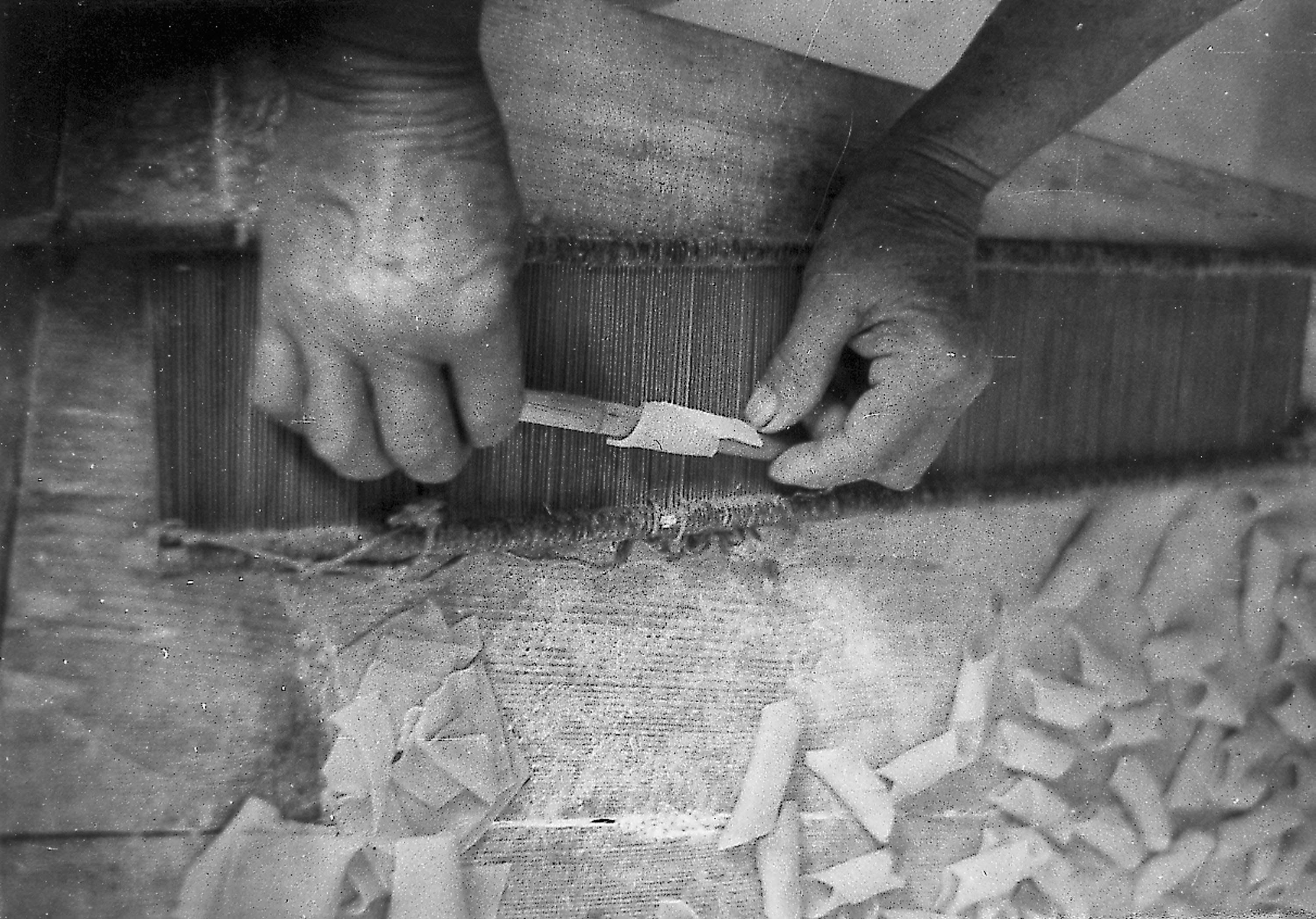
Preparing of traditional maccheroni al pèttine in Emilia-Romagna, Italy

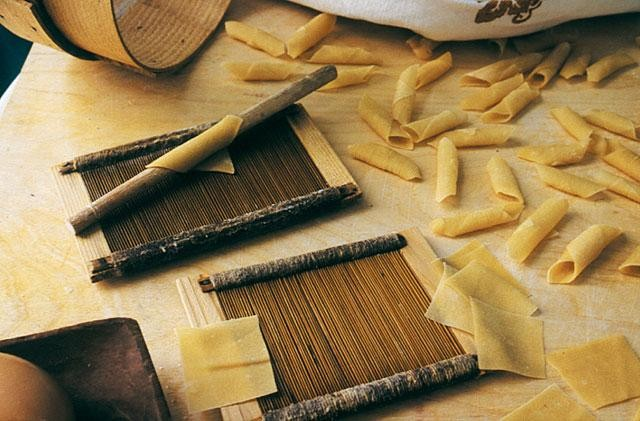
Reeds for making macaroni

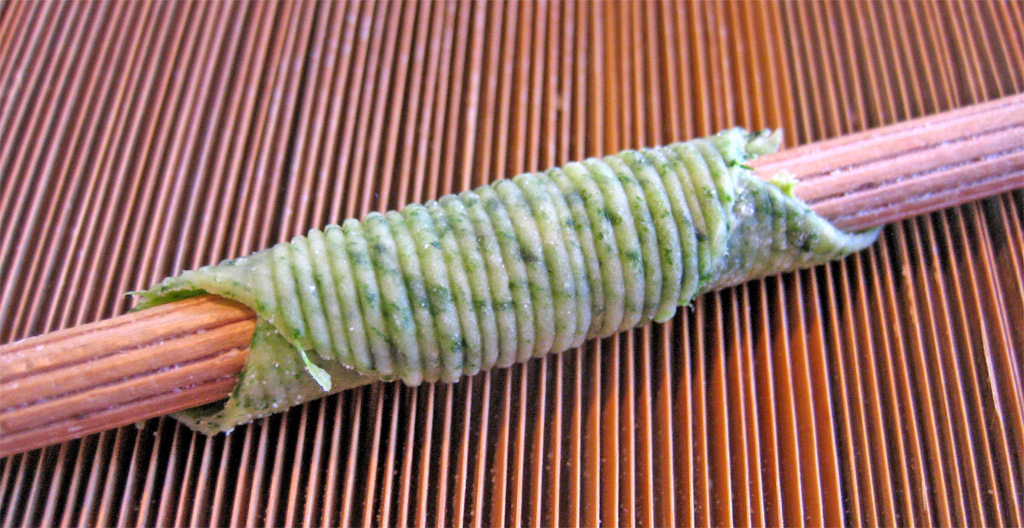
Close-up.

In Emilia-Romagna, Italy wooden reeds are still used for the traditional making of garganelli and maccheroni al pèttine (macaroni on reed). A small square of egg fresh pasta is cut, rolled on a stick and pressed on a wooden reed.

With this culinary technique, the pasta is ridged around the circumference; extruded pasta could only have longitudinal ridges.

These ridges help the pasta "hold" the dressings like bolognese sauce better than it would without ridges or with longitudinal ones.
