= Inkle =

Inkle may refer to:

- Inkle (character), a character in the comic opera Inkle and Yarico
- Inkle (company), a British video game company
- Inkle (loom), a type of warp-faced weaving loom
