= Shed (weaving) =

Temporary separation of warp yarns in weaving

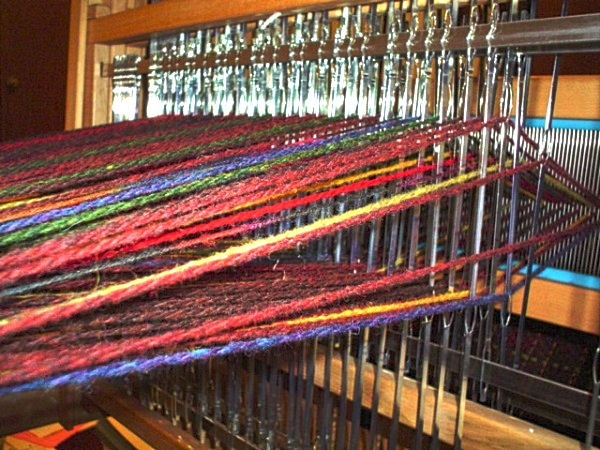
The shed, the triangular aperture on the far right, shown from the back of a table loom

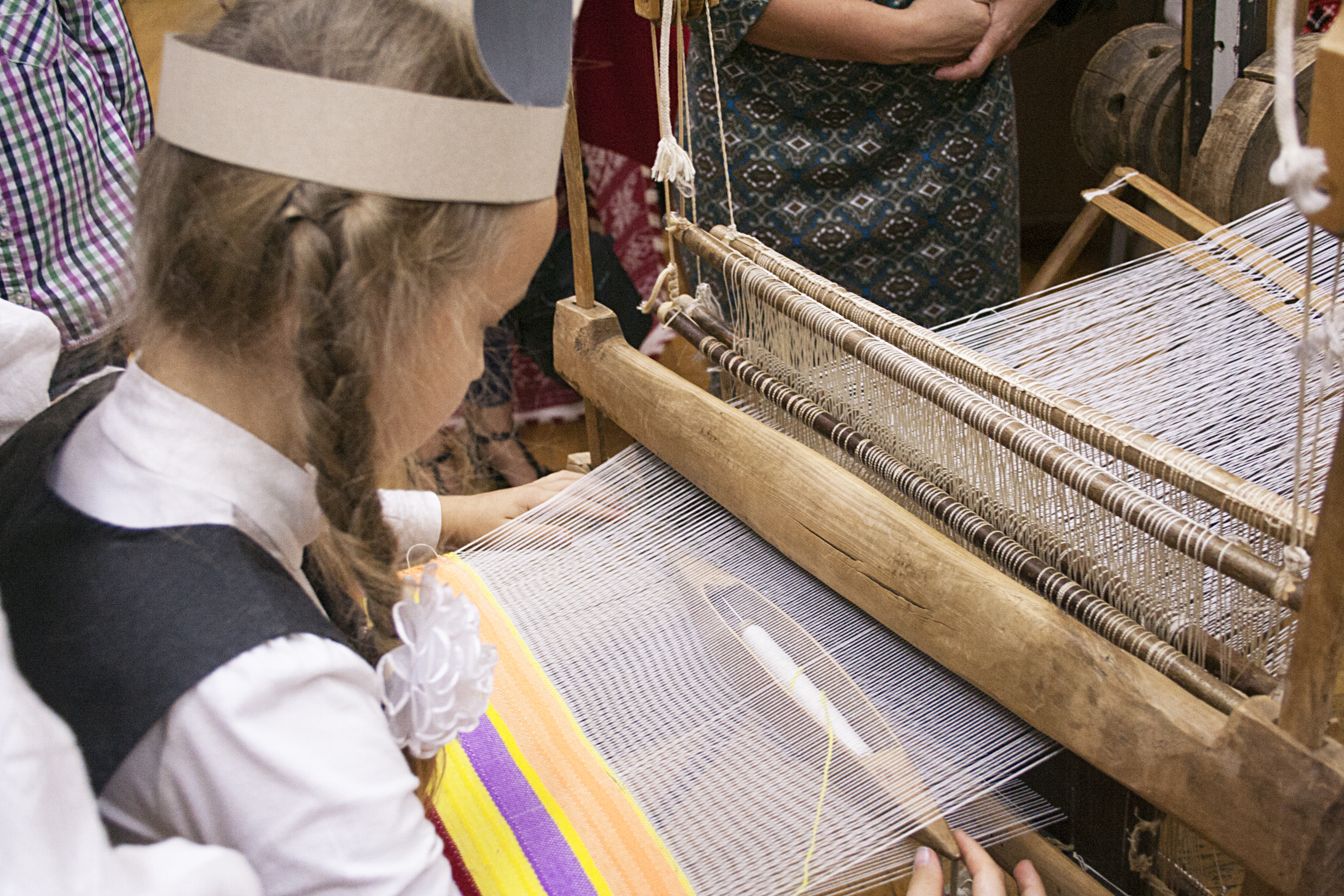
Passing the shuttle through the shed

The shed shown in tablet weaving

In weaving, the shed is the temporary separation between upper and lower warp yarns, through which the weft is woven. The shed is created in order to make it easy to interlace the weft into the warp and thus create woven fabric. Most types of looms have some sort of device which separates some of the warp threads from the others. This separation is called the shed, and allows for a shuttle carrying the weft thread to move through the shed perpendicular to the warp threads. Which threads are raised and which are lowered are changed after each pass of the shuttle.

The process of weaving can be simplified to a series of four steps: the shed is raised, the shuttle is passed through, the shed is closed, and the weft thread is beaten into place. These steps are then repeated, with a different set of threads being raised so as to interlace the warp and weft.

The term shedding refers to the action of creating a shed. A shedding device is the device used to raise or open the shed. Creating the separation is referred to as raising or opening the shed, while the reverse is known as lowering or closing the shed.

== Shedding device ==
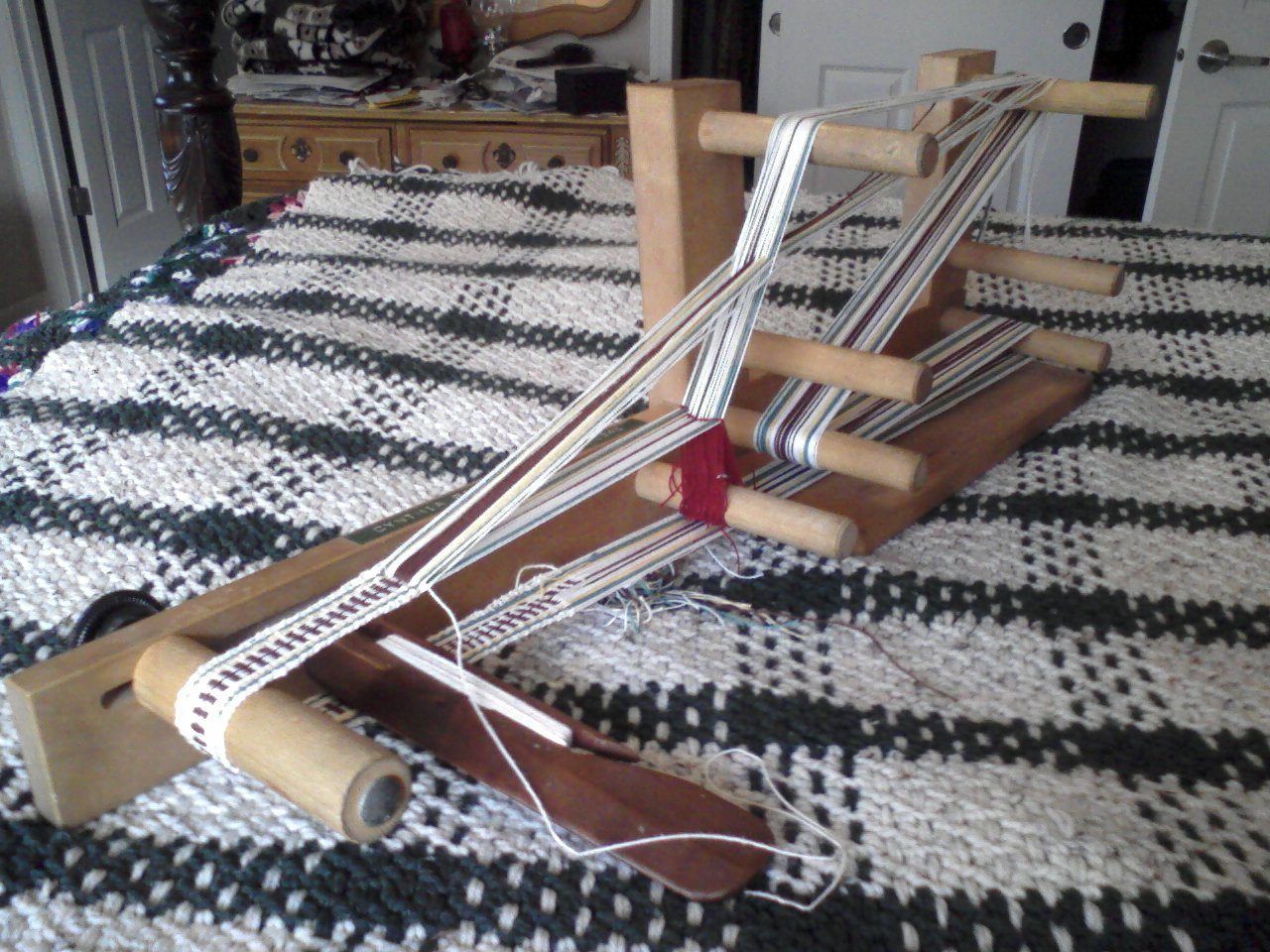
An Inkle loom

Depending on the type of loom, different devices are used to raise and lower the shed. With a tablet loom, the sheds are raised and lowered by rotating the tablets, or cards. With a floor loom, the shed is created by the harnesses. Inkle looms have one of the more primitive shedding devices, where there is one set of heddles and the shed is created by hand.

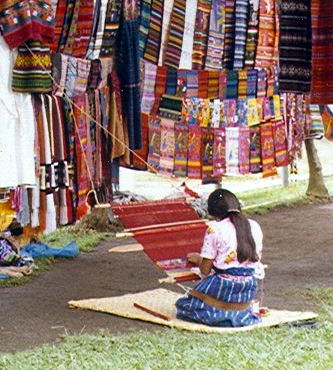
A backstrap loom with a shed-rod

Originally there was no shed, and the weft was inserted into the warp by picking the warp threads up individually, as is done in tapestry weaving. After each weft thread is woven the warp threads had to be picked out and lifted again, which made the process slow. To speed up the process various devices were developed to create a reproducible shed, so that the weft could be passed between the separated threads, and so the threads would not have to be separated individually each time. The first type of shedding device was called a shed-rod. It was a rod inserted into the warp to ease in weaving, and came about at the same time as the heddle. Threads were alternated over and under the rod, and the threads that went under the rod went through string heddles attached to a bar. The shed was created in two ways: by raising the shed-rod, and by lifting the heddles. The shed-rod was an invention of eastern origin, and was introduced to Europe via Egypt in the first century AD. The Romans used it for both plain weave and twill.

After the shed-rod came the rigid heddle loom, where the shed is created by raising or lowering the rigid heddle. As the loom progressed, the shed-rod was replaced by a second set of heddles, for a total of two shafts with heddles. Eventually looms like the modern floor loom were developed, where there are many shafts which can be raised to create the shed.

== Rising shed loom ==
Two different shedding methods were developed for the harness loom-one where any one harness or combination of harnesses was lifted while the other harnesses remained stationary. This type of loom is known as a rising shed loom, and examples include the table loom, dobby loom or the Jack loom. The other method used in harness looms is where some harnesses are raised while others are lowered. The second method lessened the effort of lifting the selected harnesses because they no longer needed to be raised as high as in a rising shed loom. Counterbalance and countermarch looms are of this second type.

== Poor shed ==
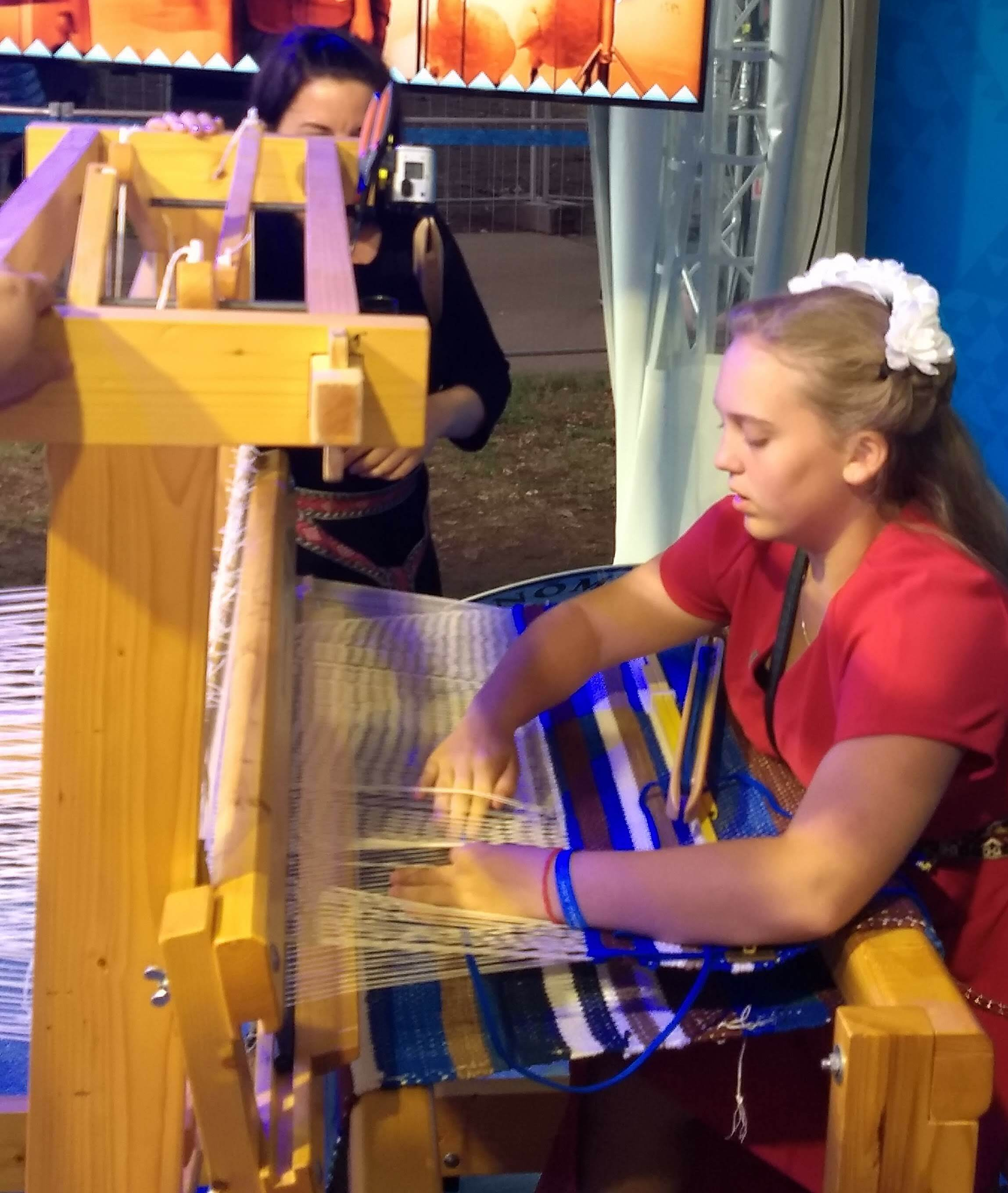
Clearing a poor shed

There are many things that can cause the warp threads not to separate cleanly, and thus produce a poor shed. A slack warp, threads set too closely in the reed, or increase of friction on the first foot or so of the warp where the threads were handled all cause poor sheds. Fuzzy yarns like mohair can also cause a poor shed. To get a better shed the weaver can lift the harnesses while the reed is against the fabric, or raise only one harness at a time. By weaving in a different manner sometimes a good shed can be created. The weaver can also insert a stick into the shed to clear it, and make way for the shuttle though this option is time-consuming.

== See also ==
- Loom § Shedding methods
