= Tablet weaving =

Weaving technique

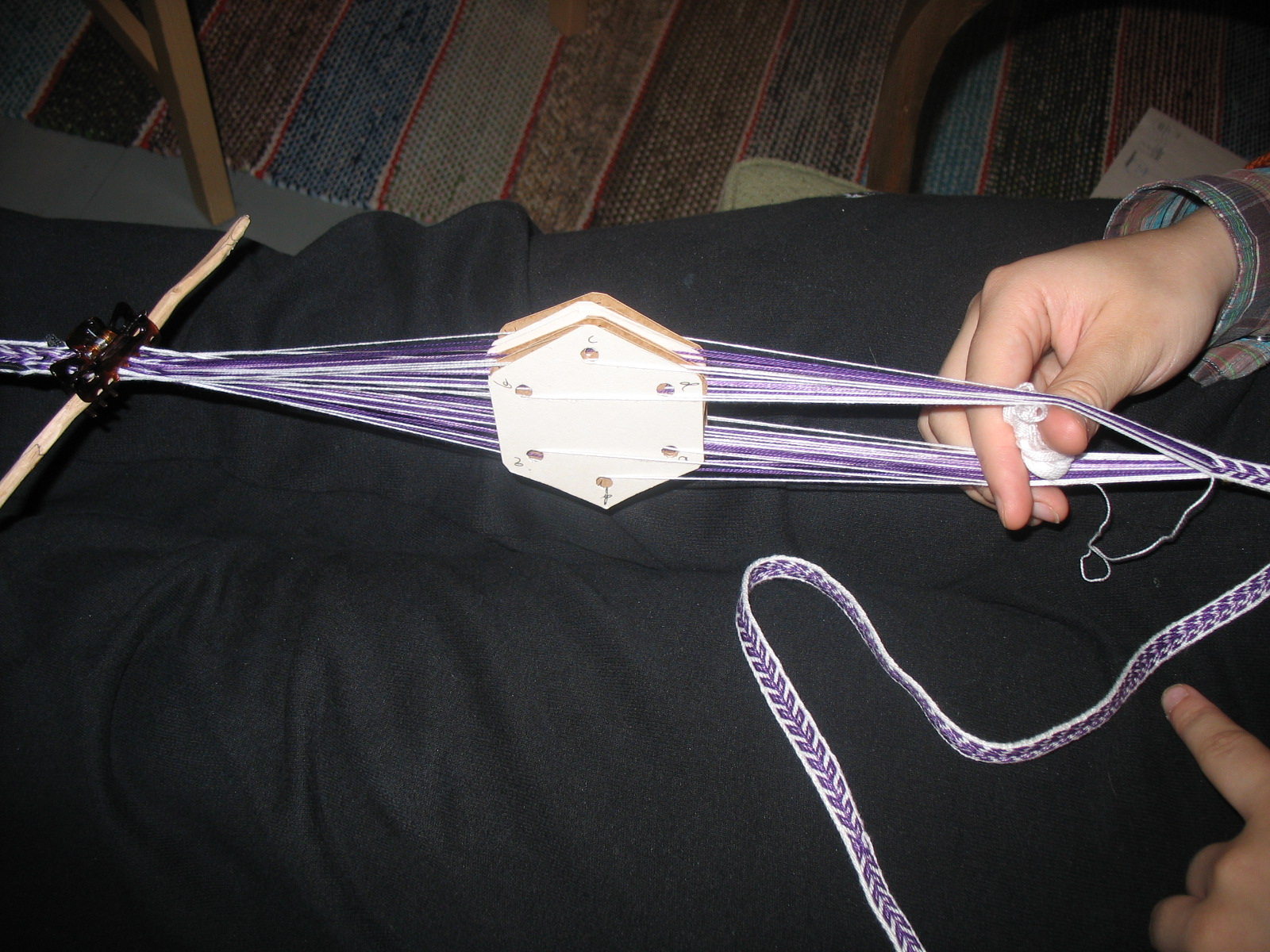
Tablet weaving, Finland (image of finished band).

Side view of tablet weaving

Tablet weaving (often card weaving in the United States) is a weaving technique where tablets or cards are used to create the shed through which the weft is passed. As the materials and tools are relatively cheap and easy to obtain, tablet weaving is popular with hobbyist weavers. Most tablet weavers produce narrow work such as belts, straps, or garment trims.

Tablet weaving is especially freeing because any pattern can be created by turning individual tablets. This is in contrast to normal looms, in which the complexity of the pattern is limited by the number of shafts available to lift threads, and the threading of the heddles.

Modern tablet weavers are often associated with historical recreation societies like the Society for Creative Anachronism. There are many online resources on tablet weaving created by members of living history groups.

== History ==
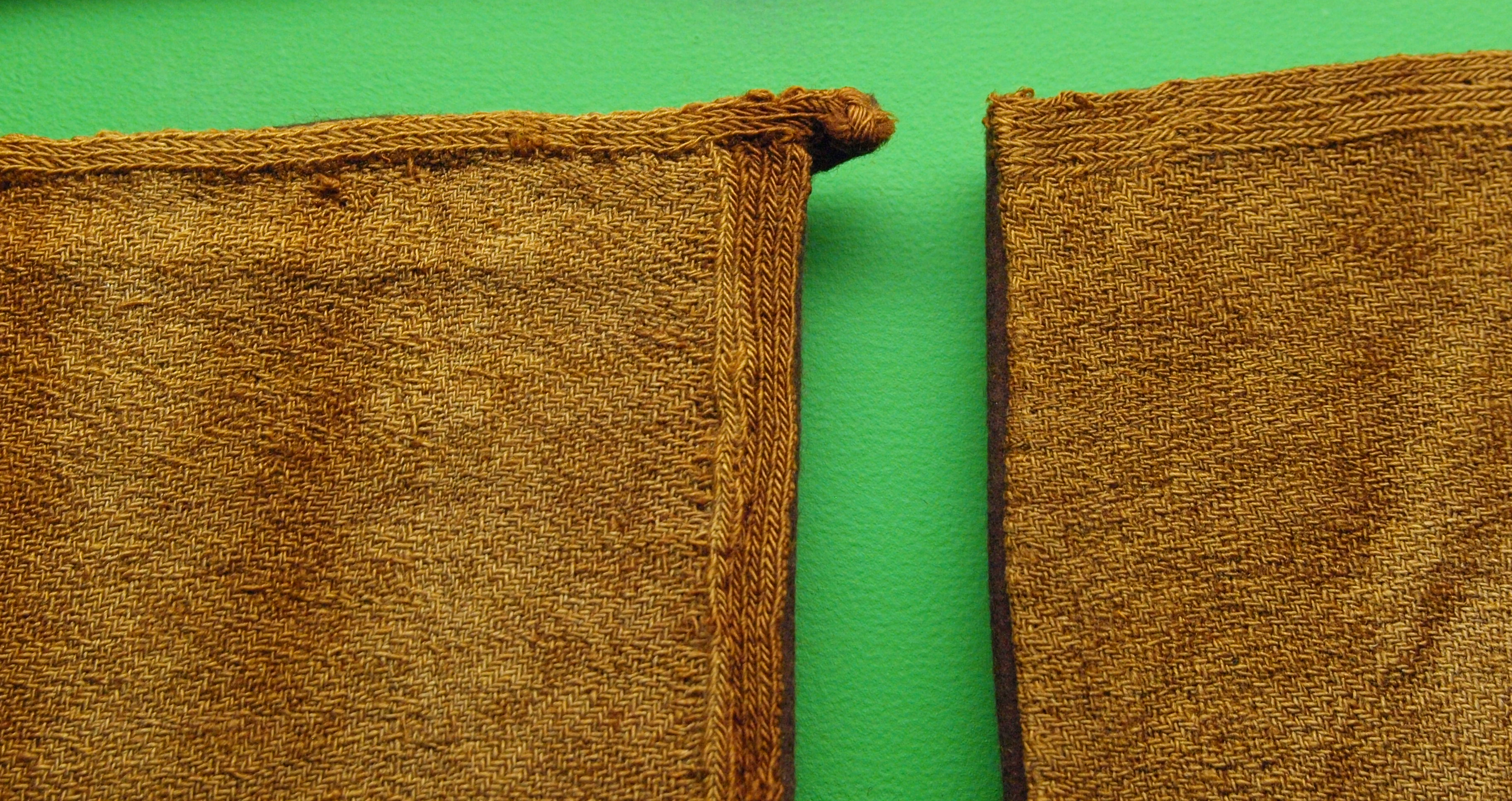
Tablet woven borders on Damendorf Mans trousers (2nd–4th century AD)

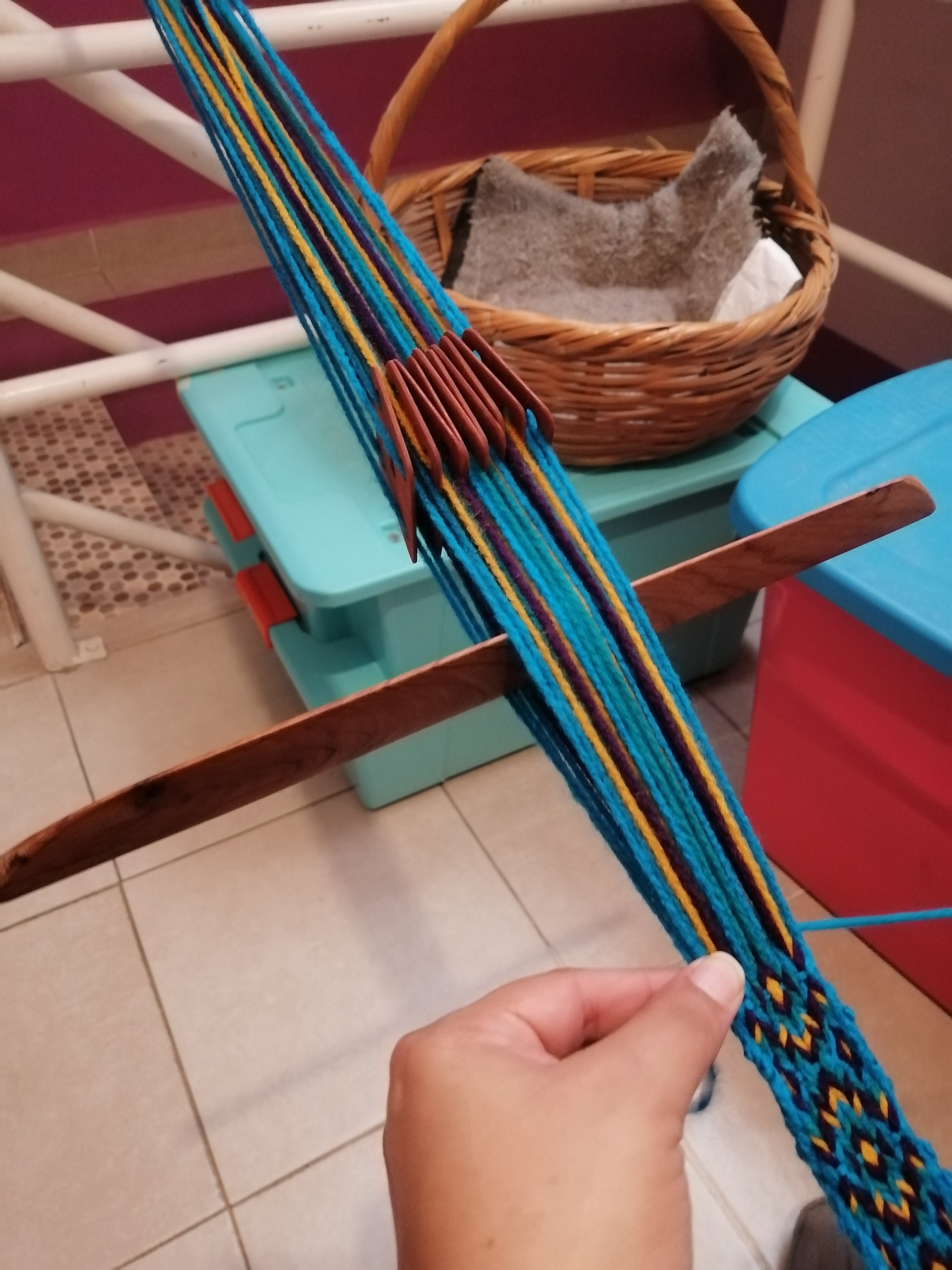
Tablet weaving in Veracruz, 2021

Tablet weaving dates back at least to the 8th century BCE in early Iron Age Europe where it is found in areas employing the warp-weighted loom. Historically the technique served several purposes: to create starting and/or selvedge bands for larger textiles such as those produced on the warp-weighted loom; to weave decorative bands onto existing textiles; and to create freestanding narrow work.

Early examples have been found at Hochdorf, Germany, and Apremont, Haute-Saône, France, as well as in Italy, Greece, and Austria. Elaborate tablet-woven bands are found in many high status Iron Age and medieval graves of Europe as well as in the Roman period in the Near East. They are presumed to have been standard trim for garments among various European peoples, including the Vikings. Many museum examples exist of such bands used on ecclesiastical textiles or as the foundation for elaborate belts in the European Middle Ages. In the 17th century, tablet weaving was also used to produce some monumental silk hangings in Ethiopia.

Tablet weaving is often erroneously believed to date back to pharaonic Egypt. This theory was advanced early in the 20th century based on an elaborate woven belt of uncertain provenance, often called the Girdle of Rameses, as it bore an inked cartouche of Rameses III. Arnold van Gennep and G. Jéquier published a book in 1916, Le tissage aux cartons et son utilisation décorative dans l'Égypte ancienne, predicated on the assumption that the ancient Egyptians were familiar with tablet weaving. Scholars argued spiritedly about the production method of the belt for decades. Many popular books on tablet weaving promoted the Egyptian origin theory until, in an appendix to his book The Techniques of Tablet Weaving, Peter Collingwood proved by structural analysis that the linen belt could not have been woven on tablets.

== Tools for tablet weaving ==
Various tablet shapes

The tablets used in weaving are typically shaped as regular polygons, with holes near each vertex and possibly at the center, as well. The number of holes in the tablets used is a limiting factor on the complexity of the pattern woven. Most patterns call for a four sided tablet. The corners of the tablets are typically rounded to prevent catching as they are rotated during weaving.

In the past, weavers made tablets from bark, wood, bone, horn, stone, leather, metal or a variety of other materials. Modern cards can also be made from cardboard or be 3D printed. Some weavers even punch holes in a set of playing cards. This is an easy way to get customized tablets or large numbers of inexpensive tablets.

The edges of tablets are usually marked with colors or stripes so that their facings and orientations can be easily noticed.

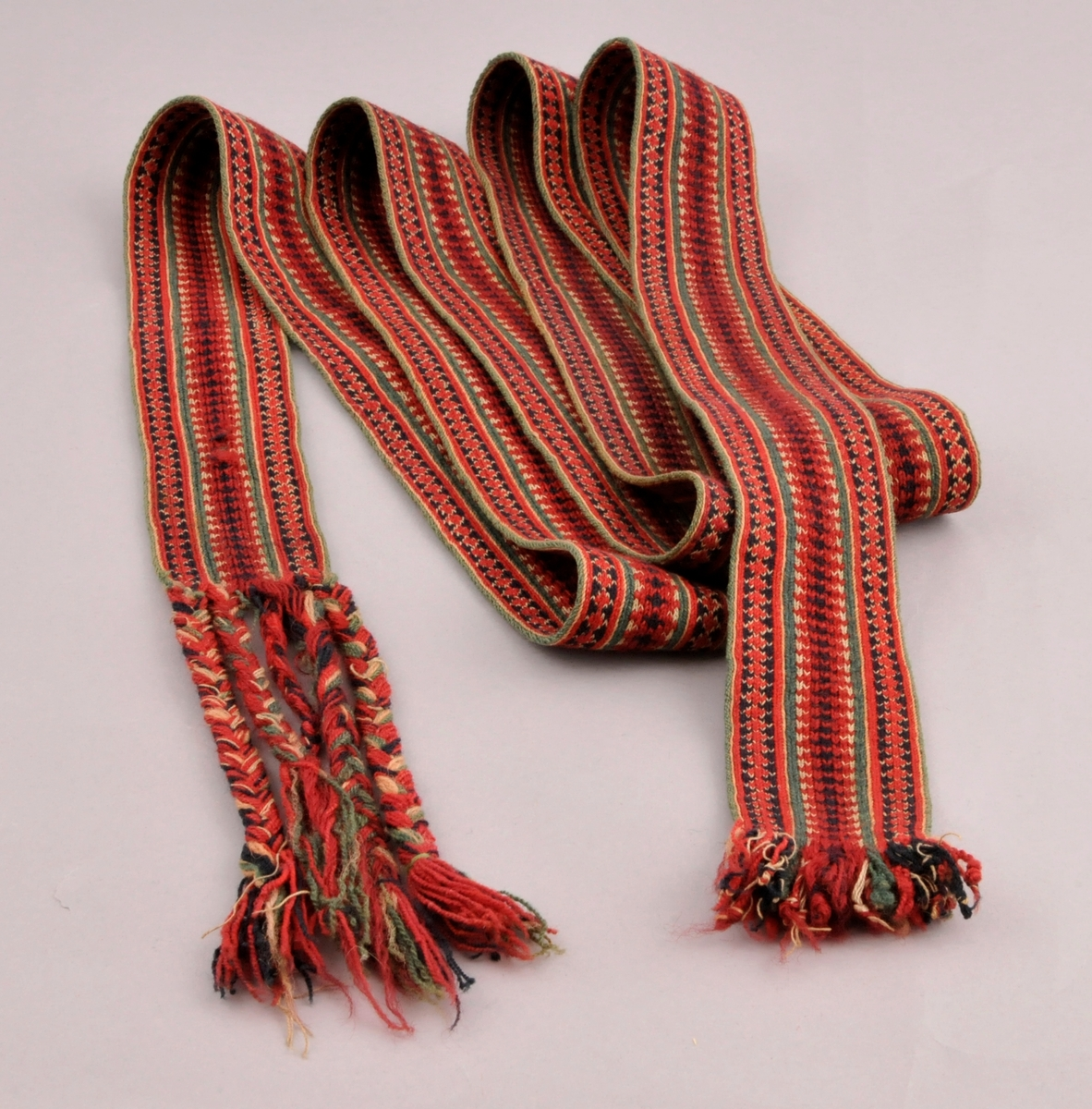
Woven belt for Norwegian national costume

== Procedure ==
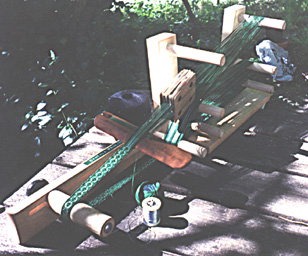
Tablet weaving on an Inkle loom

The fundamental principle is to turn the tablets to lift selected sets of threads in the warp. The tablets may be turned in one direction continually as a pack, turned individually to create patterns, or turned some number of times "forward" and the same number "back". Twisting the tablets in only one direction can create a ribbon that curls in the direction of the twist, though there are ways to thread the tablets that mitigate this issue.

Tension

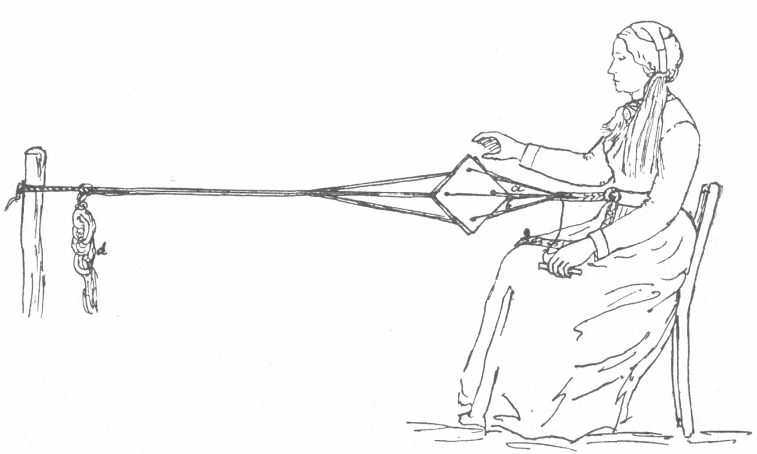
Backstrap loom in Iceland, 1903.

Tablet weaving requires the right amount of tension on the warp in order to create a smooth band. Some weavers prefer the backstrap method of weaving, where one end of the warp was tucked into (or wrapped around) the weaver's belt and the other is looped over a toe/tied to a pole or furniture. Other weavers prefer to use "Inkle" looms, which are a more modern invention and act as both loom and warping board for the project. Some traditional weavers weave between two poles and wrap the weft around the poles (similar to the Oseberg loom found in Norway dating from the 9th century). Commercial "tablet weaving looms" adapt this idea and are convenient because they make it easy to put the work down.

Patterns and Notations

Patterns are made by placing different-colored yarns in different holes, then turning individual cards until the desired colors of the weft are on top. After that, a simple pattern, like a stripe, small diamond or check, can be repeated just by turning the deck of tablets. For more complex patterns, a weaving pattern may be necessary

There are several modern pattern notation systems in tablet weaving. One of the most popular is a notation sourced from the Finnish pattern book Applesies and Fox Noses (Omenaisia ja revonnenia Suomalaisia lautanauhoja), in which the numbers on the cards are facing left when viewed from the side of the weaver. This system also gives threading direction based on the orientation of the cards rather than of the threads. When the card is in the S orientation, it forms an angled line from top left to bottom right, with the threads running from the right side of the card out the left toward the weaver. The thread itself forms a line like the middle line of a Z. Pattern threading charts differ between card and thread orientation depending on the notation system; confusing this can be the reason a pattern turns out with reversed colors. Flip the threading of the card by loosening the warp and flipping the card along the thread so that the angle of the card is opposite (S/Z).

Fully charted systems, like Applesies and Fox Noses, use a grid to show every pick of the repeat (a pick is a single turn of the cards). Each column of boxes represents a tablet, with rows going up for each pick. Unshaded boxes signal for the tablet to be turned forward (away from the weaver) and gray shaded boxes signal for the tablet to be turned backward (toward the weaver). Typically, each tablet is turned only once per pick, but some patterns may show tablets that turn more than once or not at all on some picks.

Guntrum's Tablet Weaving Thingy is an pattern plotting program that gives the numbers of which cards are turned forward or backward on each pick. There is no grid necessary, making GTT very economical for printing.

Warping

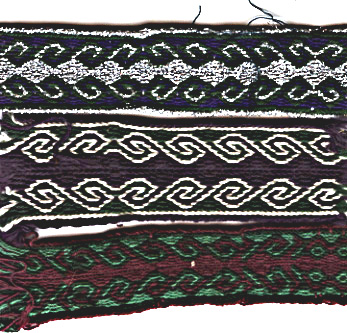
Ram's Horn pattern of tablet weaving

Warping up a pattern involves threading a yarn or cord through each hole on the card, as show in the pattern. Some patterns require that weavers thread each card individually. Others allow "continuous warping", which puts the threads through the holes of an entire deck – the four threads in the deck of cards are wrapped around two stationary objects, dropping one card each time around the fixed points.

The weight of the thread used in the warp determines the thickness of the band, which can vary greatly.

Cards are threaded in either S (in through the right of the card) or Z (in through the left of the card) directions, which alters the pattern created by turning the cards.

Weaving

A shuttle about 5 to 8 in (130 to 200 mm) long is placed in the shed to beat the previous weft, then carry the next weft into the shed. Shuttles made for tablet weaving have tapered edges to beat down the weft. Simple flat wooden or plastic shuttles work well for weaving any kind yarn from wool to cotton to silk.

Tablet weaving can also be used to weave tubes or double weave. The tablets are made to have four levels in the warp, and then two sheds are beat and wefted, one in the top pair of warps, and the other in the bottom pair, before turning the deck. Since groups of tablets can be turned separately, the length, width and joining of the tubes can be controlled by the weaver.

== See also ==
- Inkle weaving
