= Band weaving =

Fiber art technique

Band weaving is the hand production of narrow woven fabric. This fabric may be called tape, band, inkle, strap, belt, back strap, trim, and more. It can be accomplished on a variety of types of looms, including inkle, band, tape, backstrap, and rigid heddle looms. Hole and slot heddles are also designed to weave bands. Depending on which loom is used, the material could be warp-faced or a balanced weave.

== Types of band weaving ==
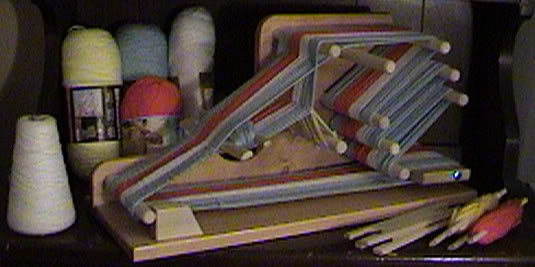
Weaving on an inkle loom

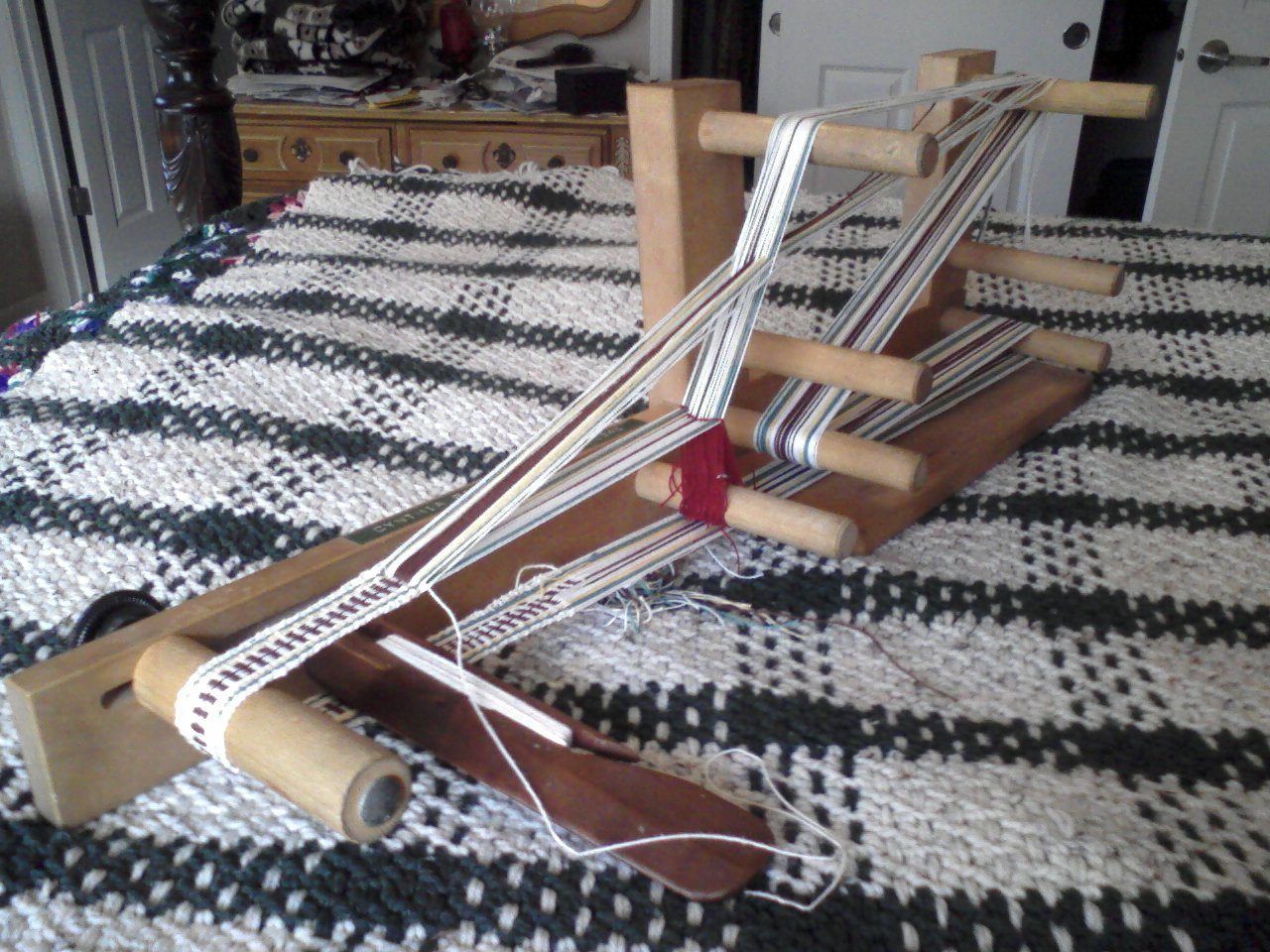
Weaving on an inkle loom

=== Inkle ===
Inkle weaving is a type of warp-faced weaving where the shed is created by manually raising or lowering the warp yarns, which can be held in place by fixed heddles or tablets. According to the Oxford English Dictionary, the term inkle has several meanings, the first of which is "A kind of linen tape, formerly much used for various purposes." The derivation of the word is uncertain. Inkle weaving is commonly used for narrow work such as trims, straps and belts. Inkle weaving is done on a loom known as an inkle loom. One key element that differentiates inkle looms from other band looms is that a continuous warp is required.

==== History ====
A table-top inkle loom was patented by Mr. Gilmore of Stockton, California in the 1930s but inkle looms and weaving predate this by centuries.

Inkle weaving was referred to 3 times in Shakespeare: in Love's Labour's Lost (Act III, Scene I), Pericles, Prince of Tyre (Act V), and in The Winter's Tale (Act IV, Scene IV). Jonathan Swift mentioned inkle weavers in his Polite Conversations.

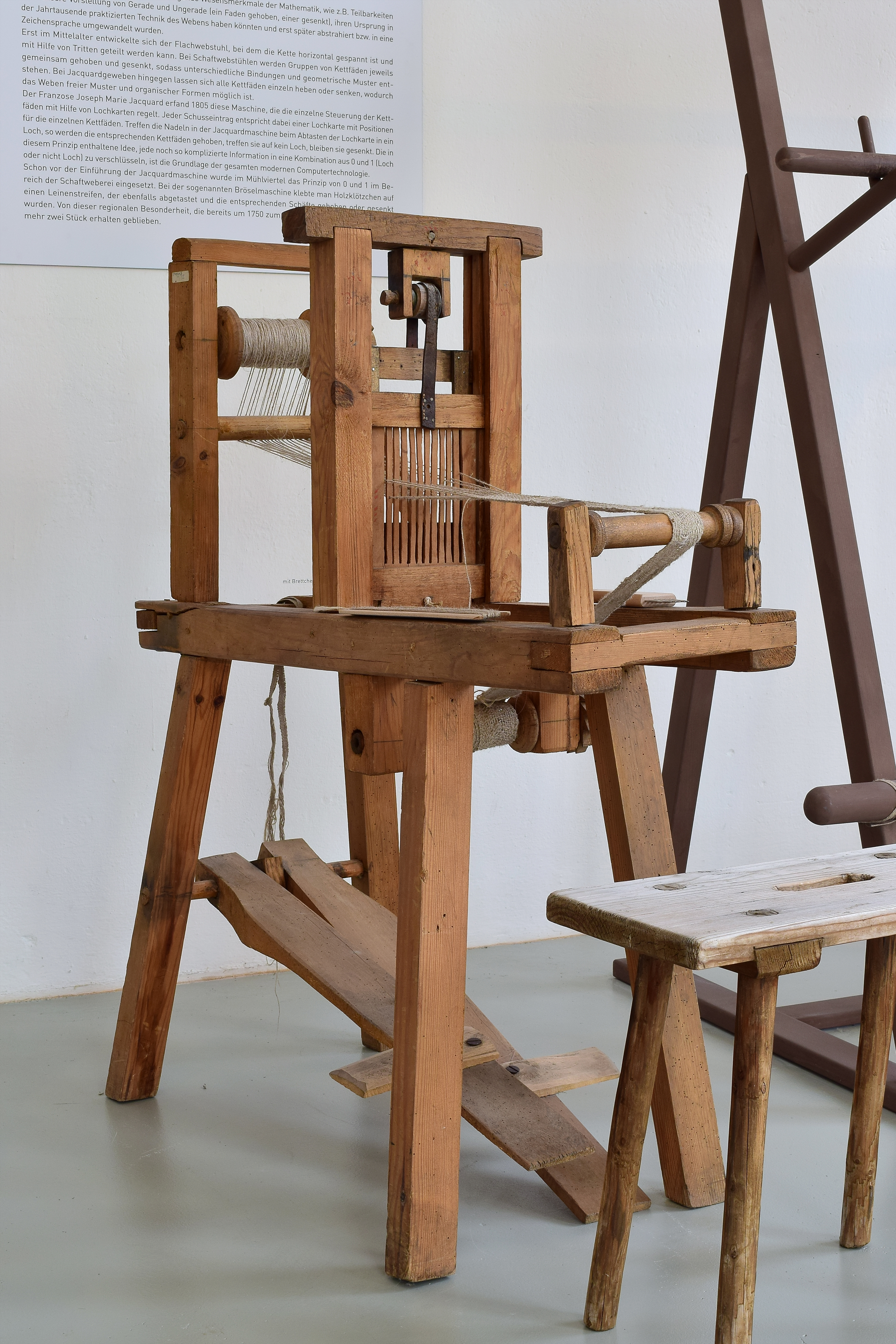
Band loom

==== Equipment ====
Inkle looms are constructed as floor-standing and table-top models. The loom is characterized by a wooden framework upon which dowels have been fastened. These dowels will hold the warp threads when the loom has been dressed.

One of the dowels, or a paddle, is constructed so that its position can be adjusted. This tensioning device will be taken in as weaving commences and the warp threads become shorter. Additional equipment includes yarn for the warp and weft, yarn or thread for forming heddles and a shuttle to hold the weft.

==== Process ====
The inkle loom is threaded with warp threads according to the weaver's design, alternating between yarn that can be raised and lowered and yarn that is secured in place through the use of the heddles. The raising and lowering of these warp threads creates the shed through which the weft thread will be carried on a shuttle. The weaver should make one pass with the shuttle with each opening of a shed through the raising and lowering of threads.

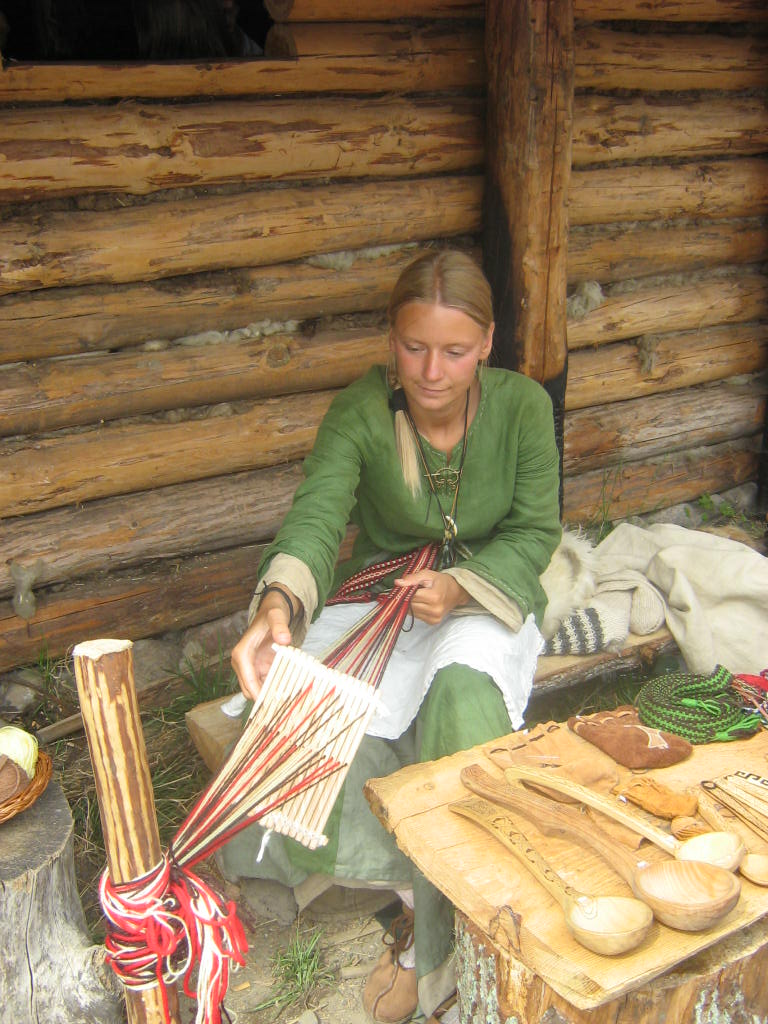
Weaving on a backstrap loom with a rigid heddle

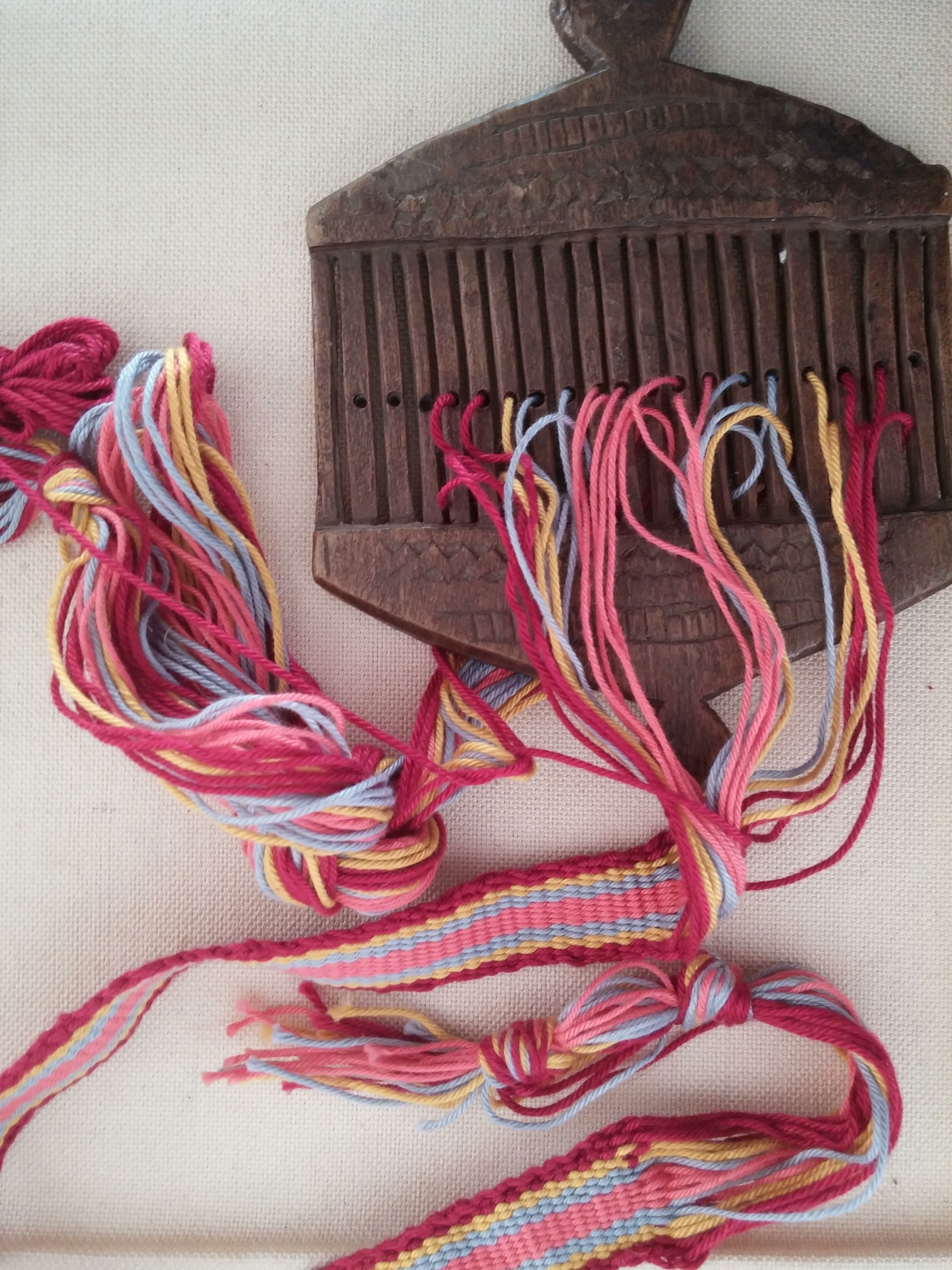
Unwound for transport, with a smaller hole and slot heddle

There are other more advanced techniques in which, instead of merely allowing warp threads to alternate in their up or down positions, individual threads are brought to the surface to form what is called a "pick up" pattern. One side of the band will show the exposed surfaces of warp threads while, on the other side of the pattern, the weft thread will be visible. Using a supplemental weft thread that will come up over the top of certain warp threads, brocaded designs can also be worked into the inkle band.

An inkle loom is also useful in the practice of tablet weaving for its added portability. The warp is threaded onto the loom as in inkle weaving, but weaving cards are used instead of alternating between free-hanging and heddle-secured yarn.

=== Tape ===
==== History ====
Handwoven tape was very important in Europe starting in the 1500s. This need for tape was also evident in the US, from the colonial period to the mid-1900s. It was used to tie and tie up clothing such as hosiery, tie pockets to garments, serve as candle wicks, ties for grain and feed bags, and other household uses. Many farm households had tape looms, which may well have been built by a family member.

==== Equipment ====
Because tape looms in their heyday were not mass produced, they took a wide variety of forms, most designed to be easily portable. There were types that were indicative of a certain geographic area. In Scandinavia, paddle-like hole and slot heddles were common, they were also found in colonial America. The earliest form of these rigid heddles is as a part of a backstrap set-up. This form of weaving has been used in Africa, South America, and Mexico. Box looms housing a rigid heddle were found in colonial America and in England in particular.

== Band uses ==
Bands can be used as bookmarks, trim, belts, cords for jewelry, bag straps and more.Re-enactors use woven tape for garment ties and drawstrings, as well as other uses such as tying bundles. Inkle bands are quite strong and can be used in applications where a flat band is desired. Popular modern uses are guitar and camera straps, or, for particularly narrow bands, colorful shoelaces. Traditionally, inkle bands also served as belts and reins.

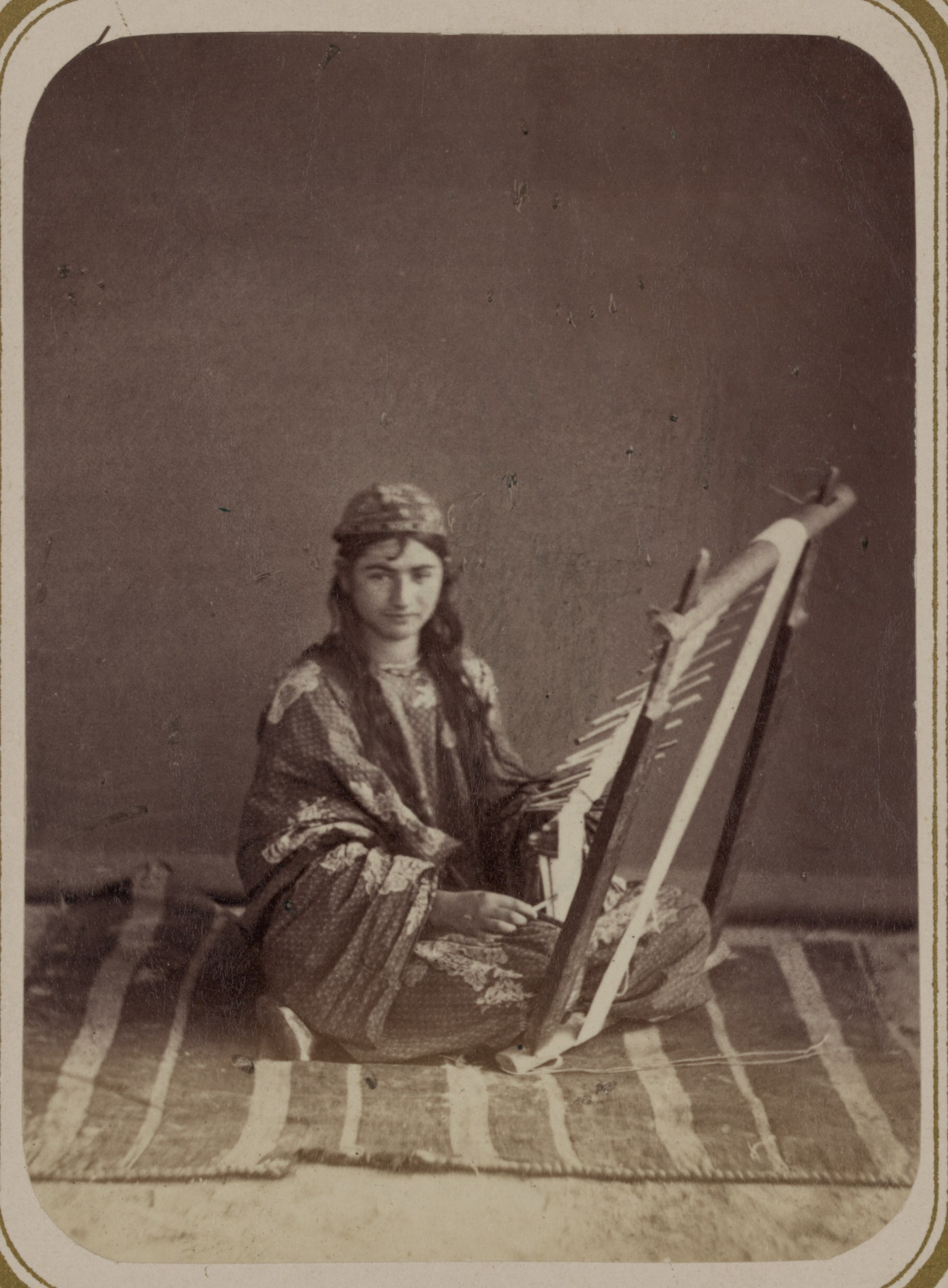
Weaving on a frame loom in Turkistan, 1865

== See also ==
- Loom
- Tablet weaving is often done on inkle looms
