= Shuttle (weaving) =

Weaving tool

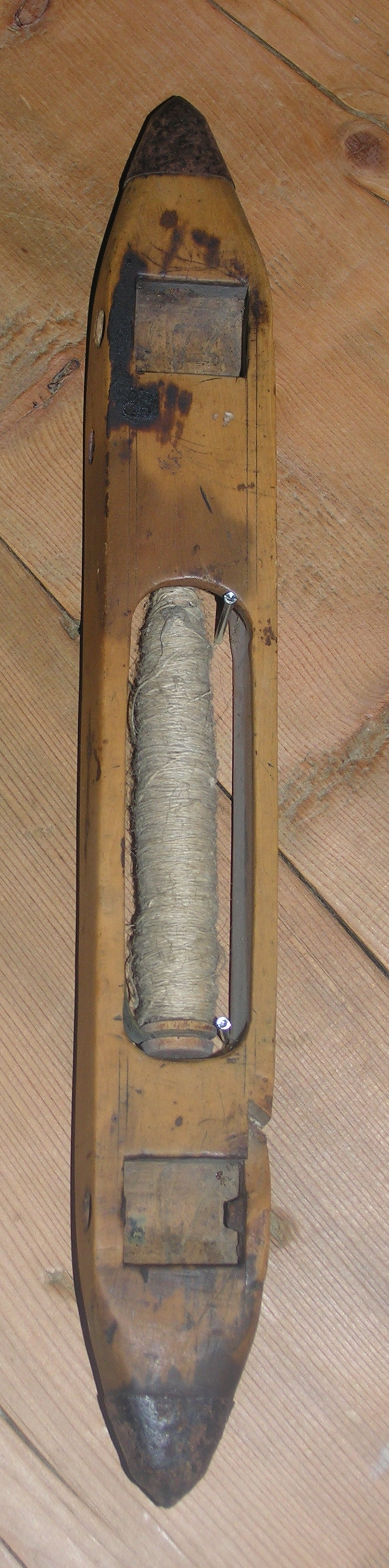
Shuttle with bobbin

A shuttle is a tool designed to neatly and compactly store a holder that carries the thread of the weft yarn while weaving with a loom. Shuttles are thrown or passed back and forth through the shed, between the yarn threads of the warp in order to weave in the weft.

The simplest shuttles, known as "stick shuttles", are made from a flat, narrow piece of wood with notches on the ends to hold the weft yarn. More complicated shuttles incorporate bobbins or pirns.

In the United States, shuttles are often made of wood from the flowering dogwood, because it is hard, resists splintering, and can be polished to a very smooth finish. In the United Kingdom shuttles were usually made of boxwood, cornel, or persimmon.

== Gallery ==
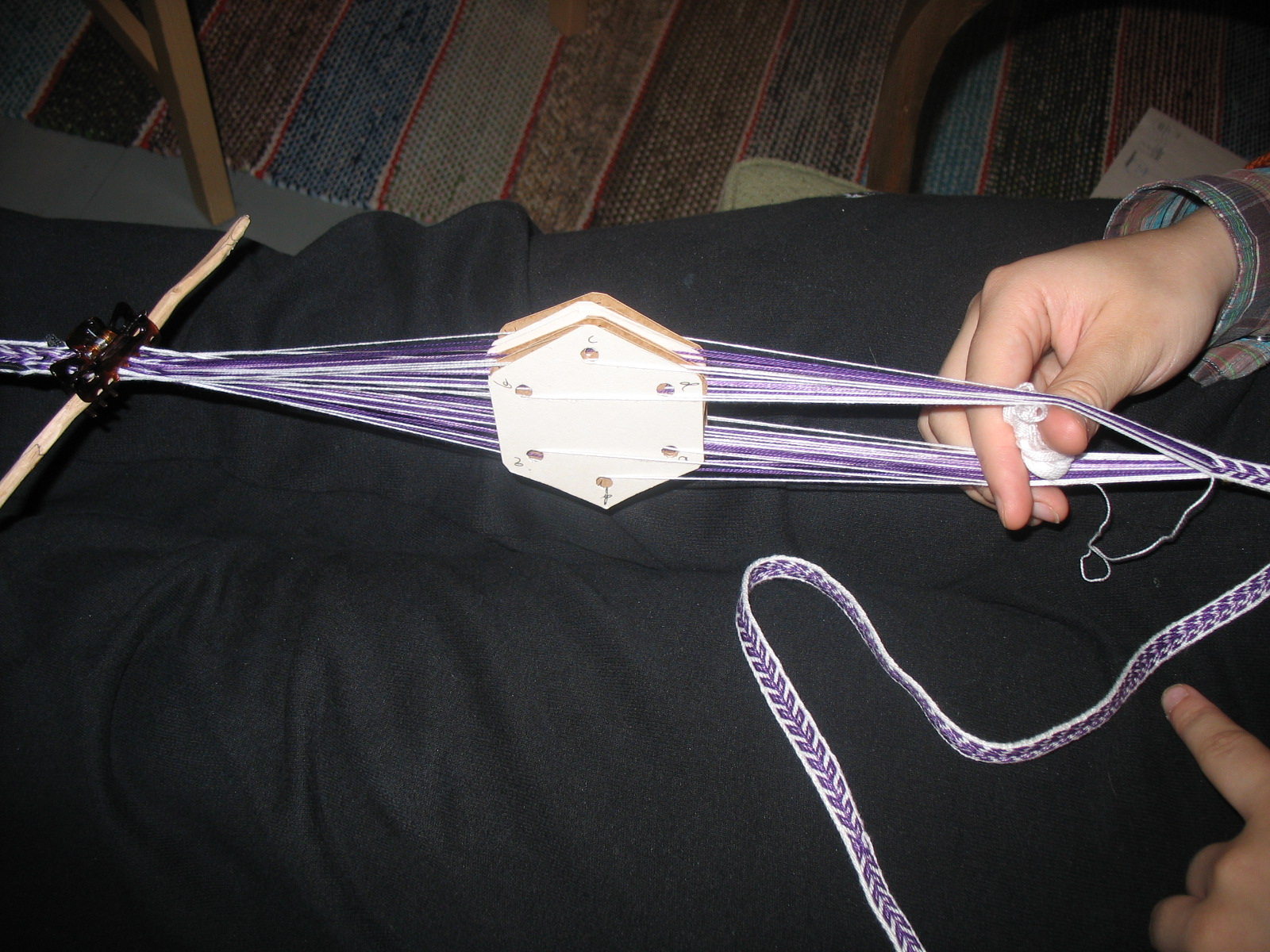
No shuttle; just passing a ball of yarn through the shed. Tablet weaving, Finland.

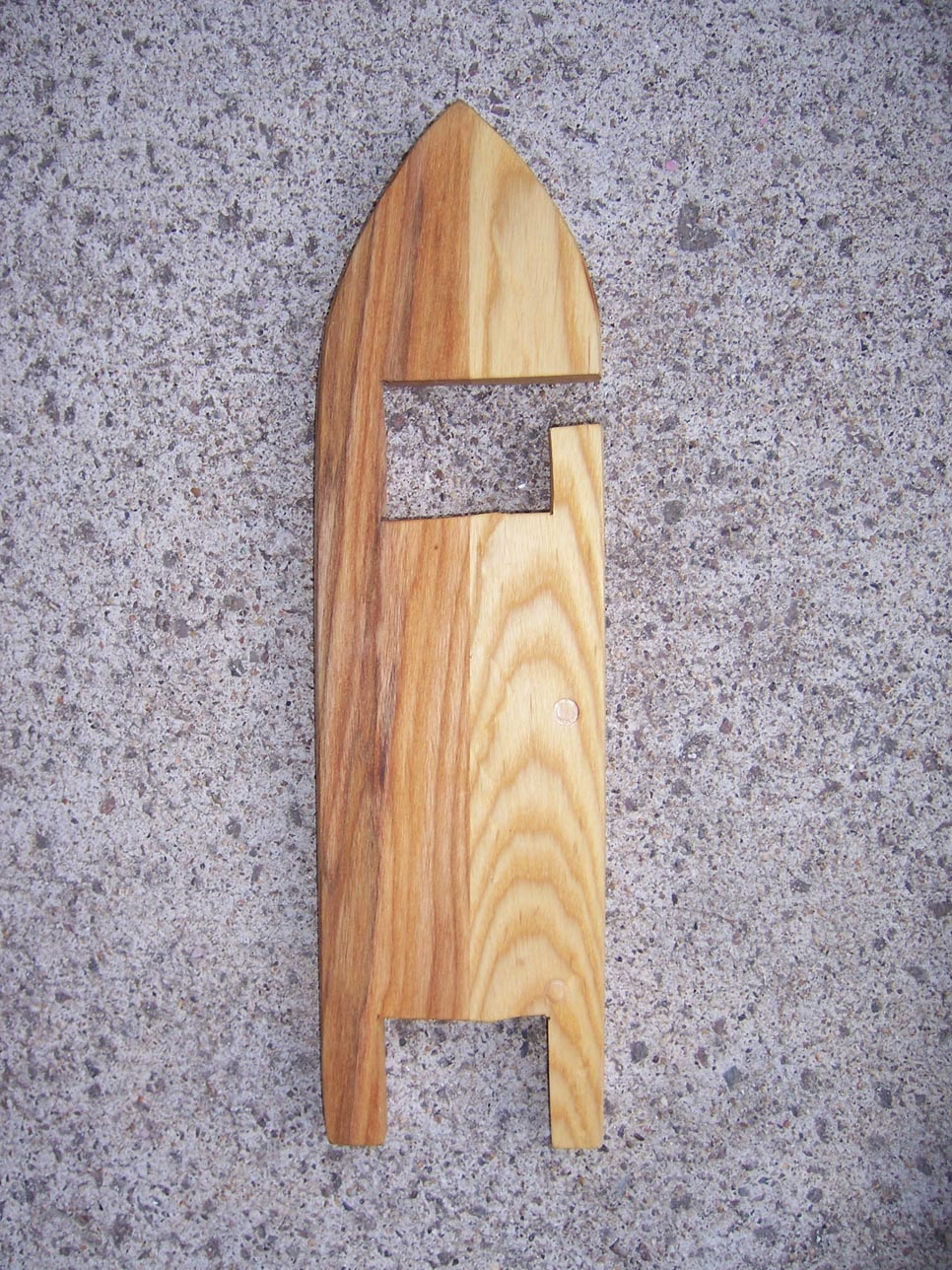
Large stick shuttle

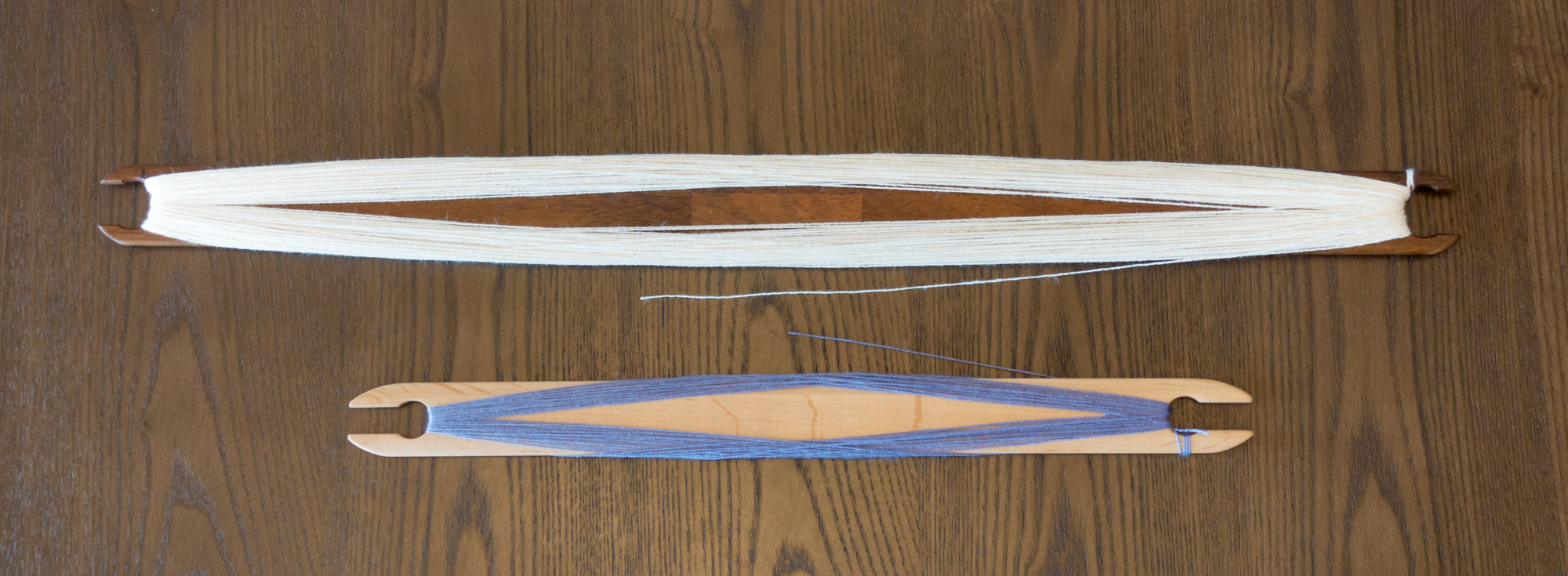
Two stick shuttles, 24" and 16" long, both wound with 8/2 yarns

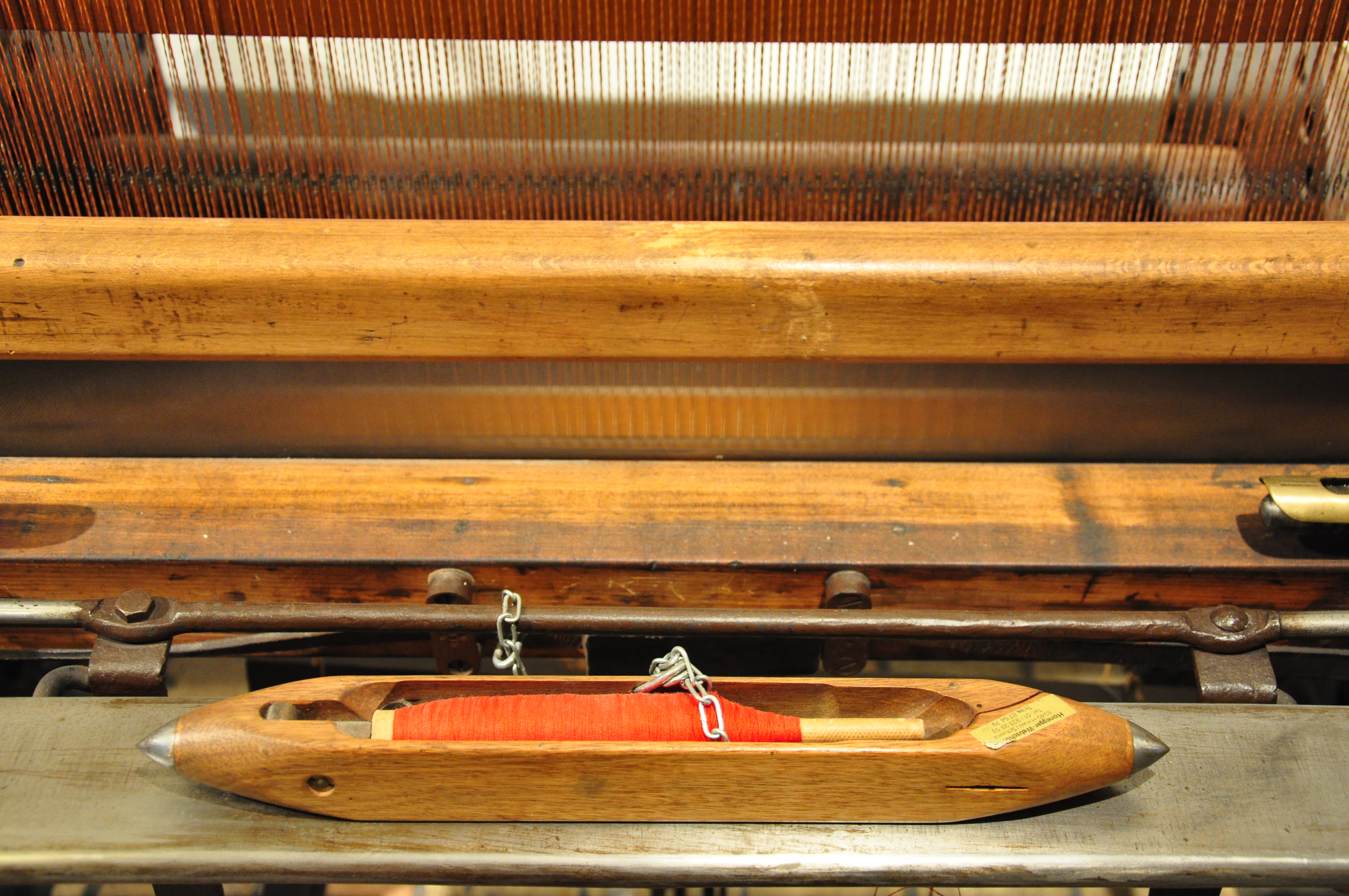
Rüti (Switzerland): loom built by Honegger & Cie. in 1860, exposed in the former Rüti Abbey's Bailiff's house

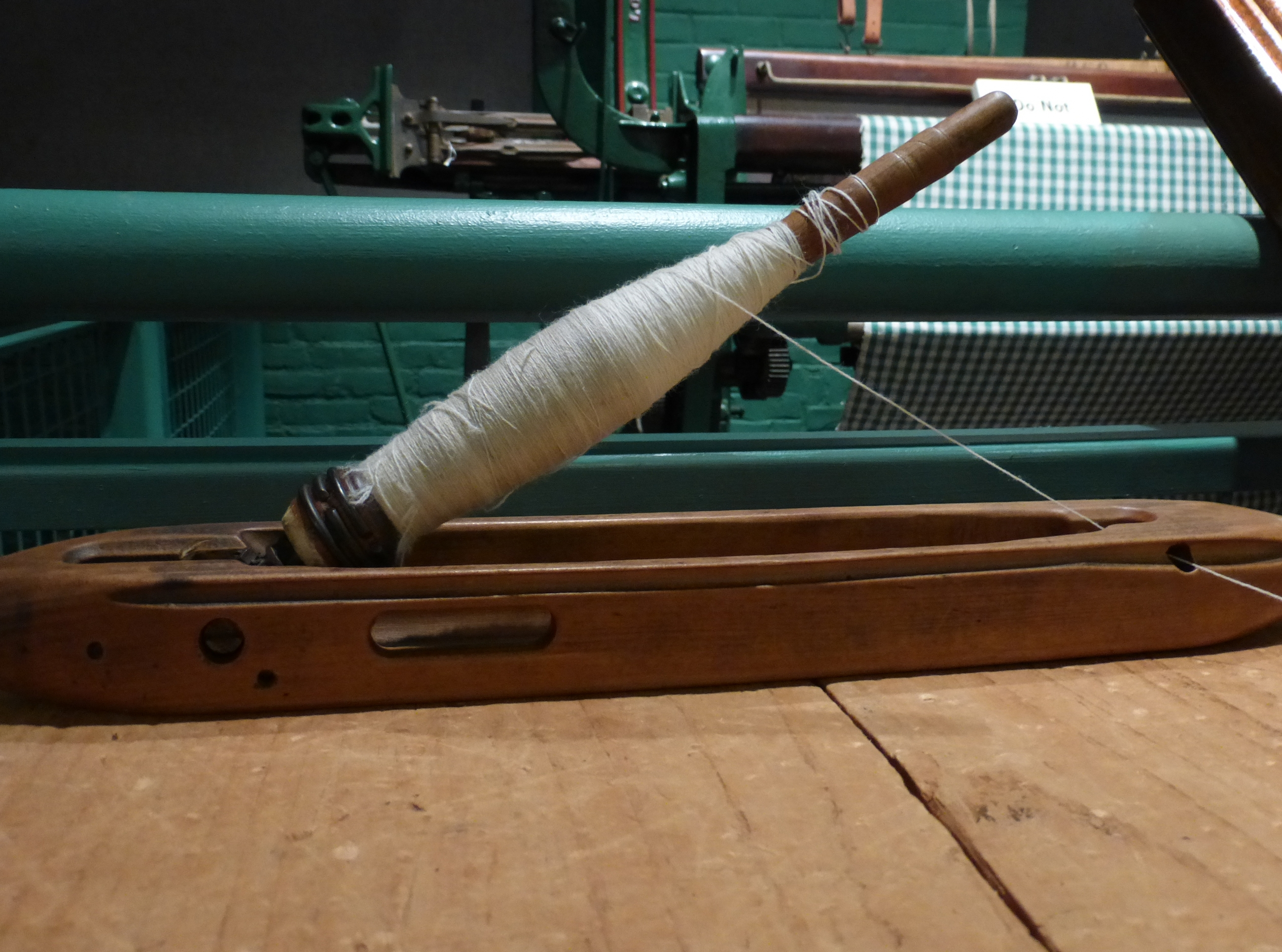
Threading a bobbin shuttle

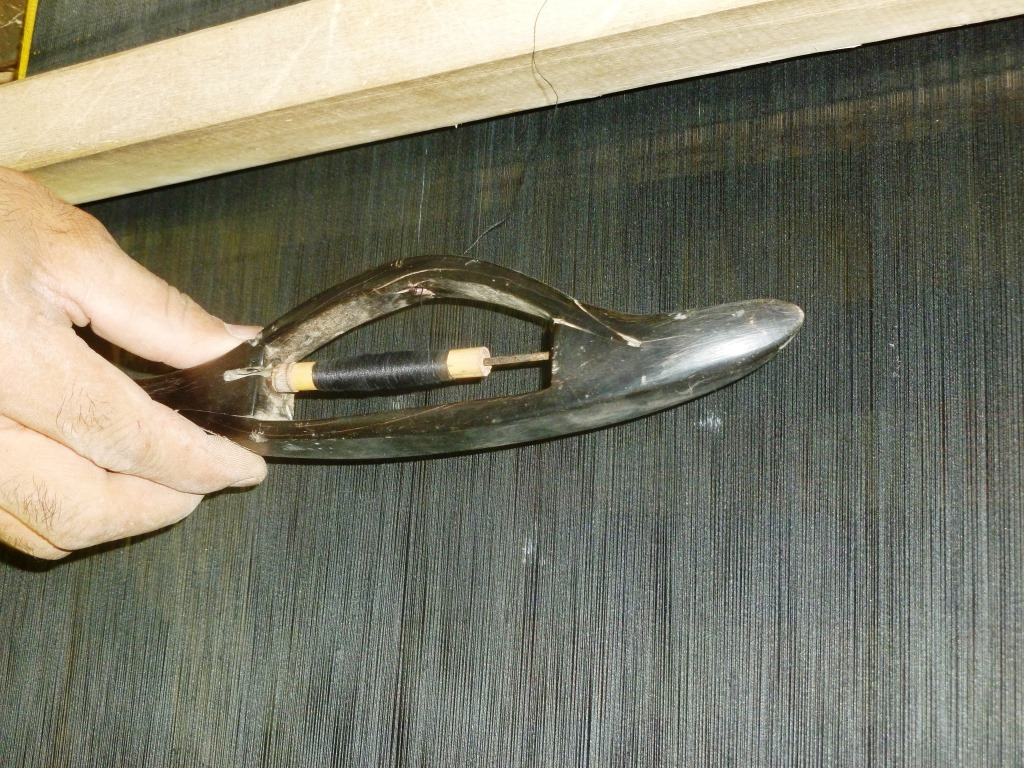
Shuttle for silk weaving. Khotan, Xinjiang. 2010
