= Heddle =

Loom component that acts as a weft passage

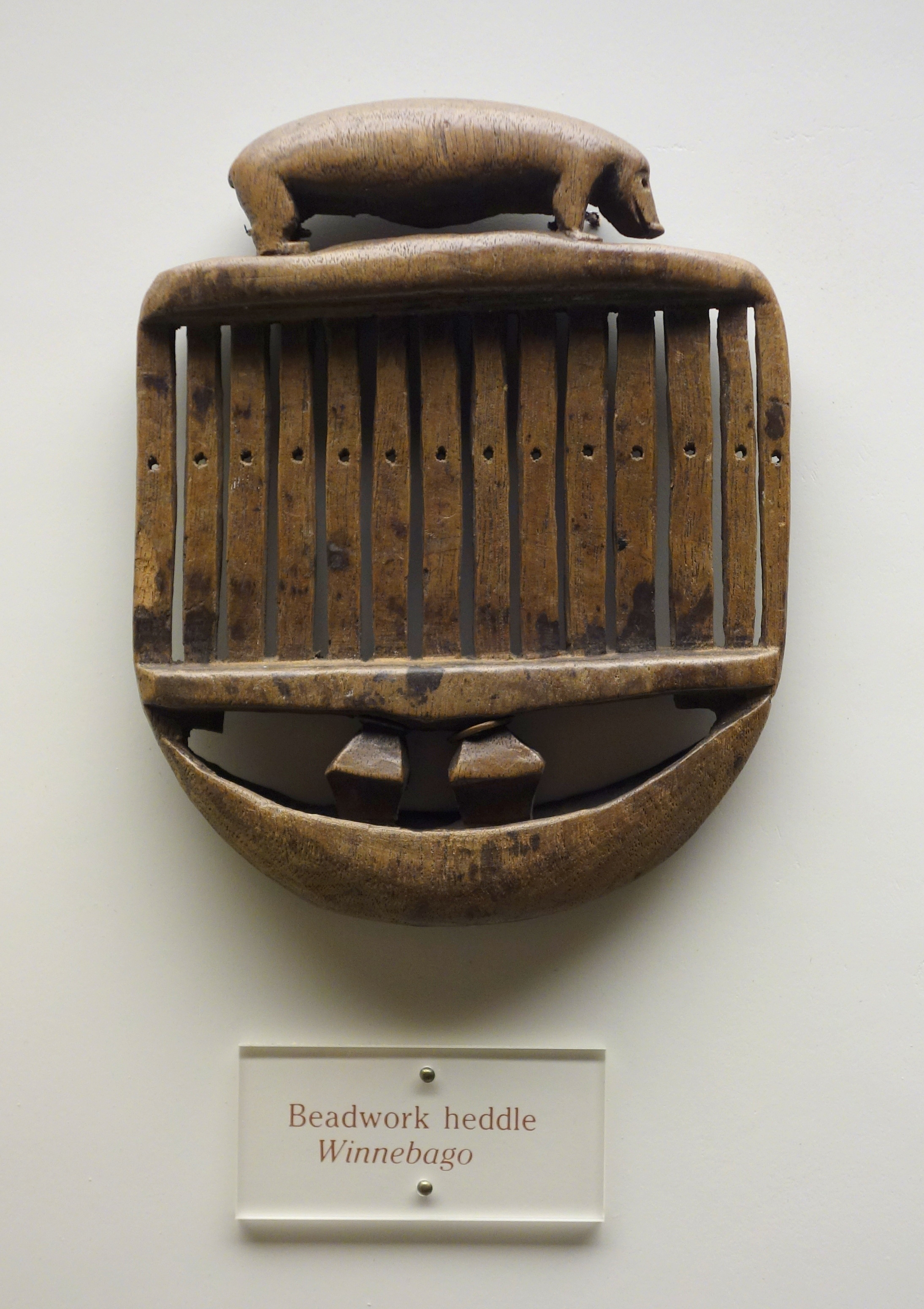
Undated Ho-Chunk heddle for beadwork bands, Wisconsin, USA.

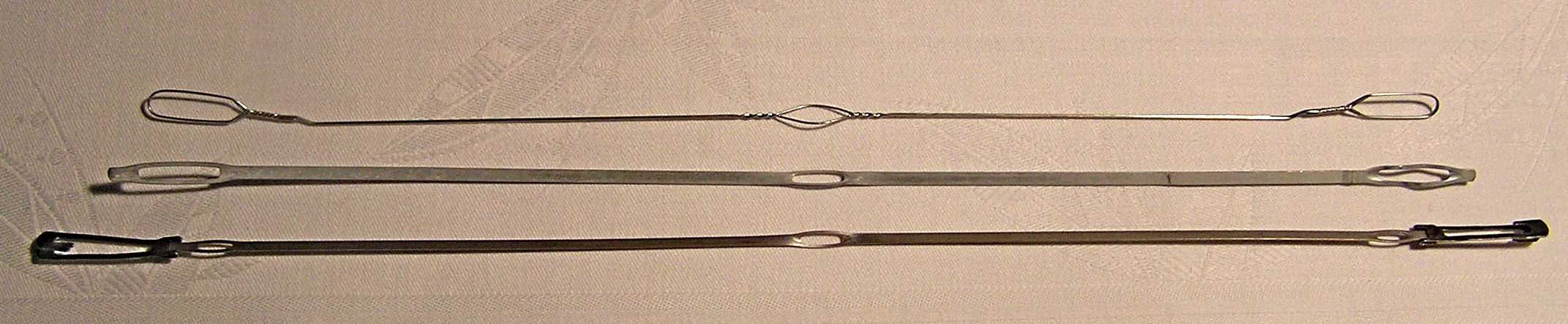
Three different types of heddles: a wire, flat steel, and a repair heddle

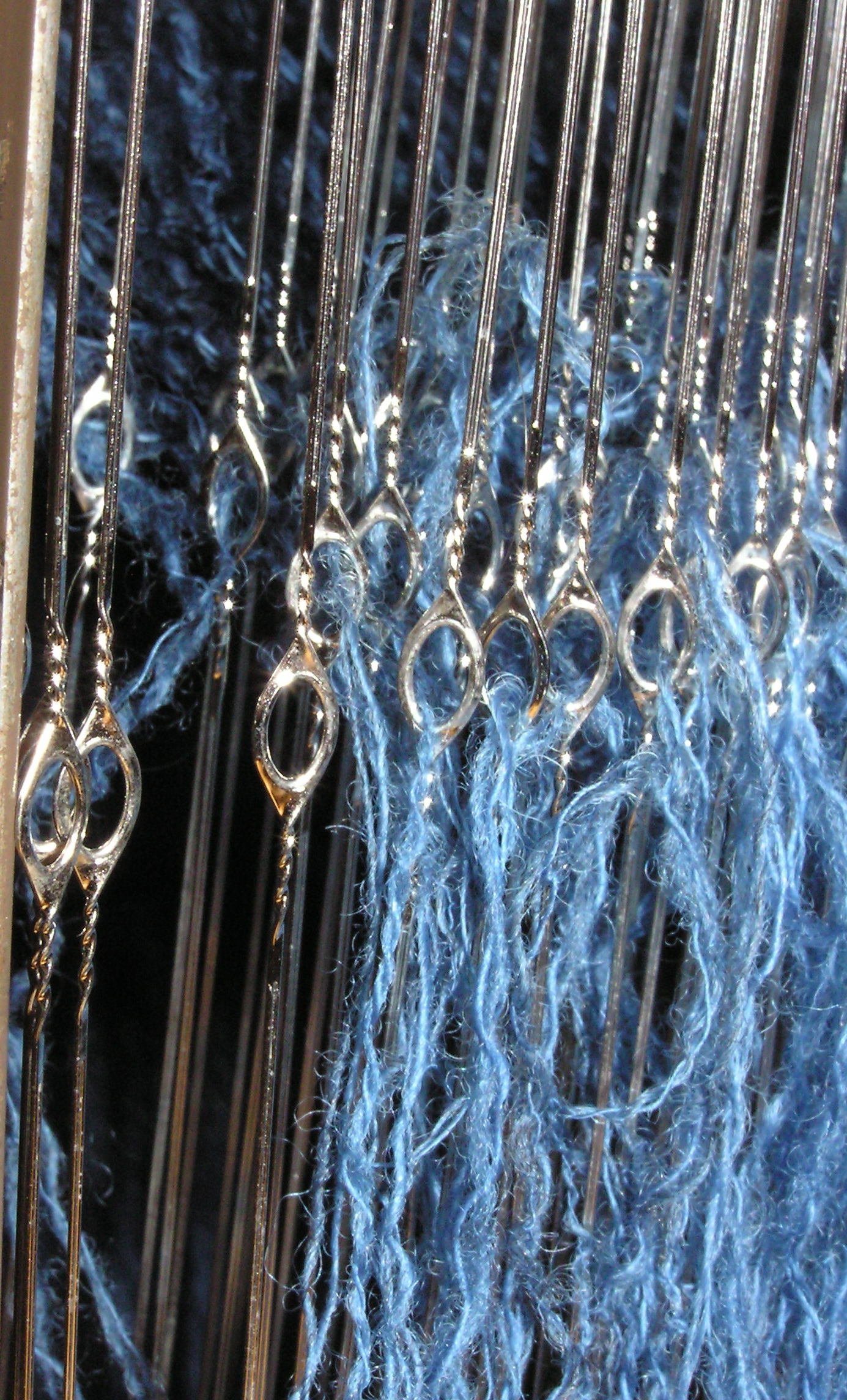
Inserted eye wire heddles

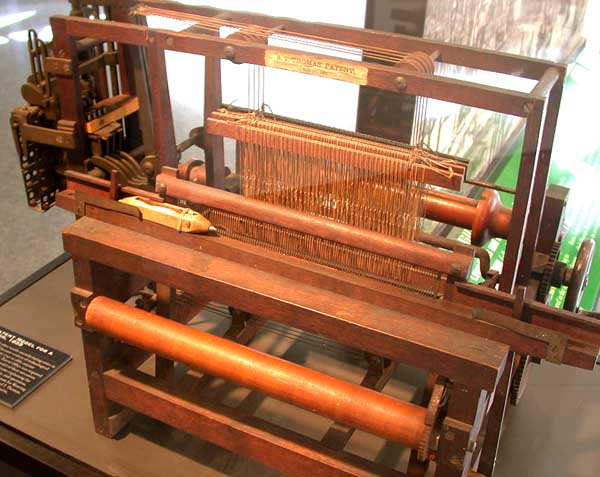
Patent model of a mechanized loom with string heddles

A heddle or heald is an integral part of a loom. Each thread in the warp passes through a heddle, which is used to separate the warp threads for the passage of the weft. The typical heddle is made of cord or wire and is suspended on a shaft of a loom. Each heddle has an eye in the center where the warp is threaded through. As there is one heddle for each thread of the warp, there can be near a thousand heddles used for fine or wide warps. A handwoven tea-towel will generally have between 300 and 400 warp threads and thus use that many heddles.

In weaving, the warp threads are moved up or down by the shaft. This is achieved because each thread of the warp goes through a heddle on a shaft. When the shaft is raised the heddles are too, and thus the warp threads threaded through the heddles are raised. Heddles can be either equally or unequally distributed on the shafts, depending on the pattern to be woven. In a plain weave or twill, for example, the heddles are equally distributed.

The warp is threaded through heddles on different shafts in order to obtain different weave structures. For a plain weave on a loom with two shafts, for example, the first thread would go through the first heddle on the first shaft, and then the next thread through the first heddle on the second shaft. The third warp thread would be threaded through the second heddle on the first shaft, and so on. In this manner the heddles allow for the grouping of the warp threads into two groups, one group that is threaded through heddles on the first shaft, and the other on the second shaft.

While the majority of heddles are as described, this style of heddle has derived from older styles, several of which are still in use. Rigid heddle looms, for example, instead of having one heddle for each thread, have a shaft with the 'heddles' fixed, and all threads go through every shaft.

== Metal heddles ==
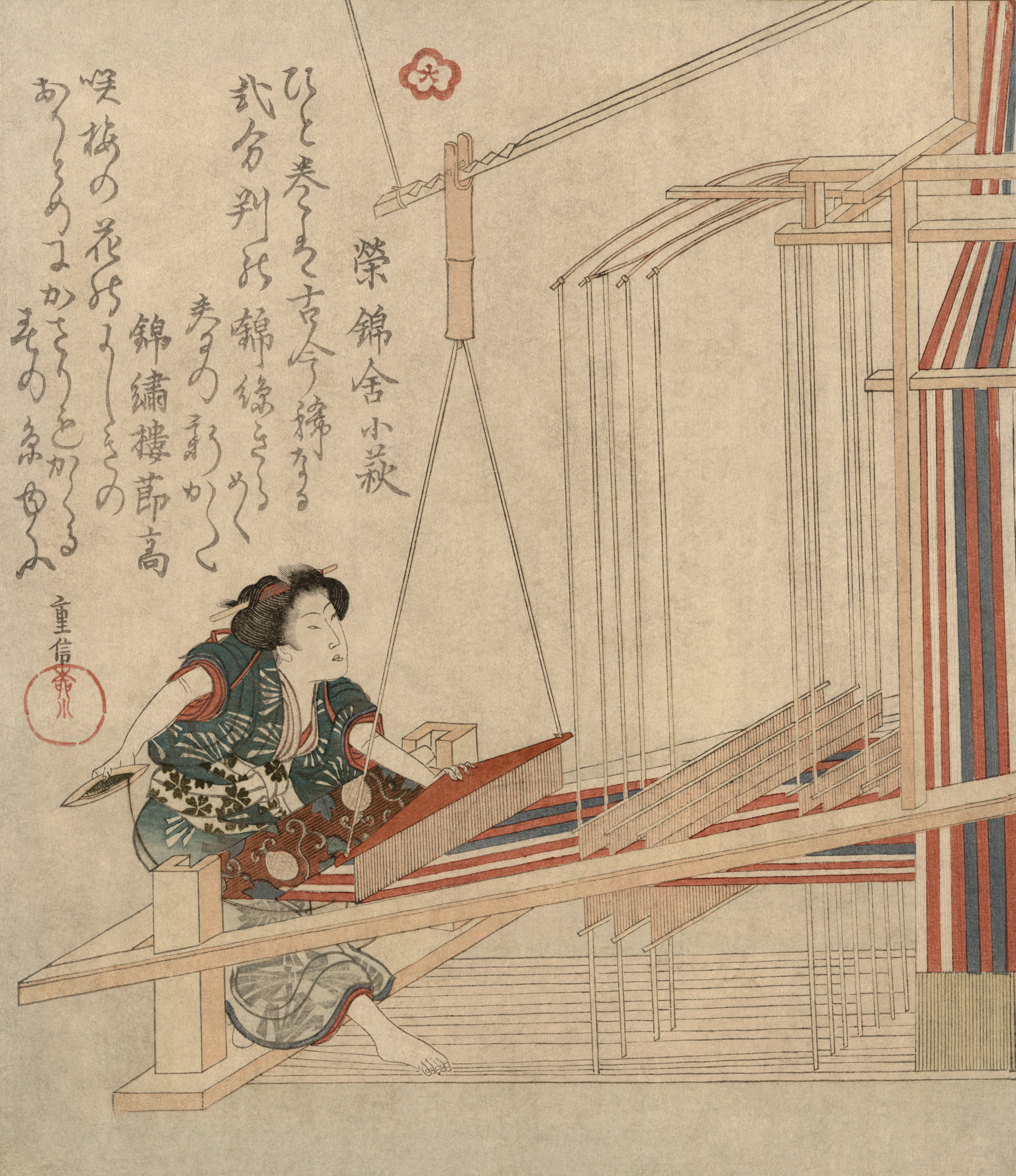
An early nineteenth century Japanese loom with several heddles which the weaver controls with her foot

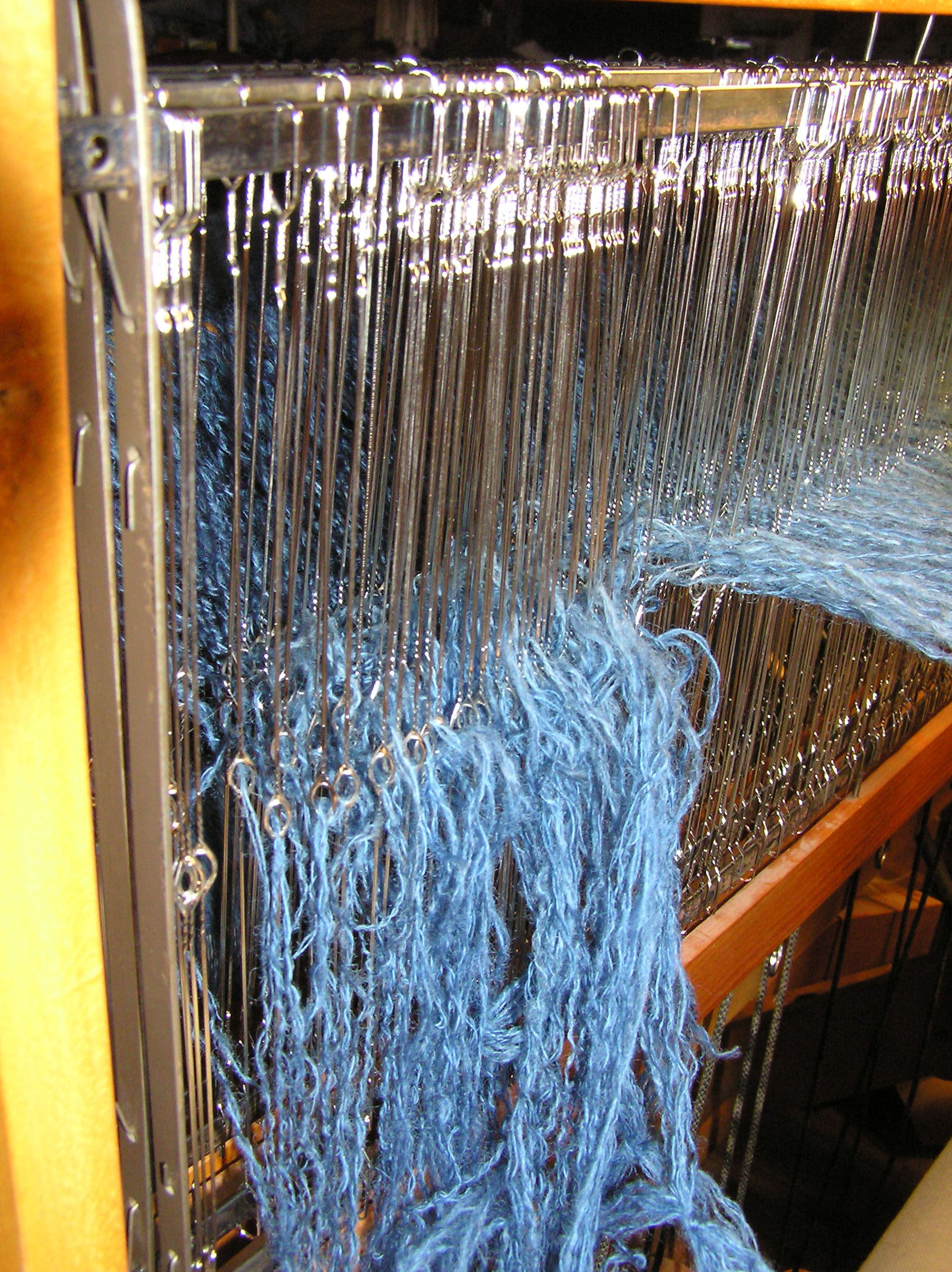
A loom from the back, in the process of warping, showing a shaft of threaded heddles.

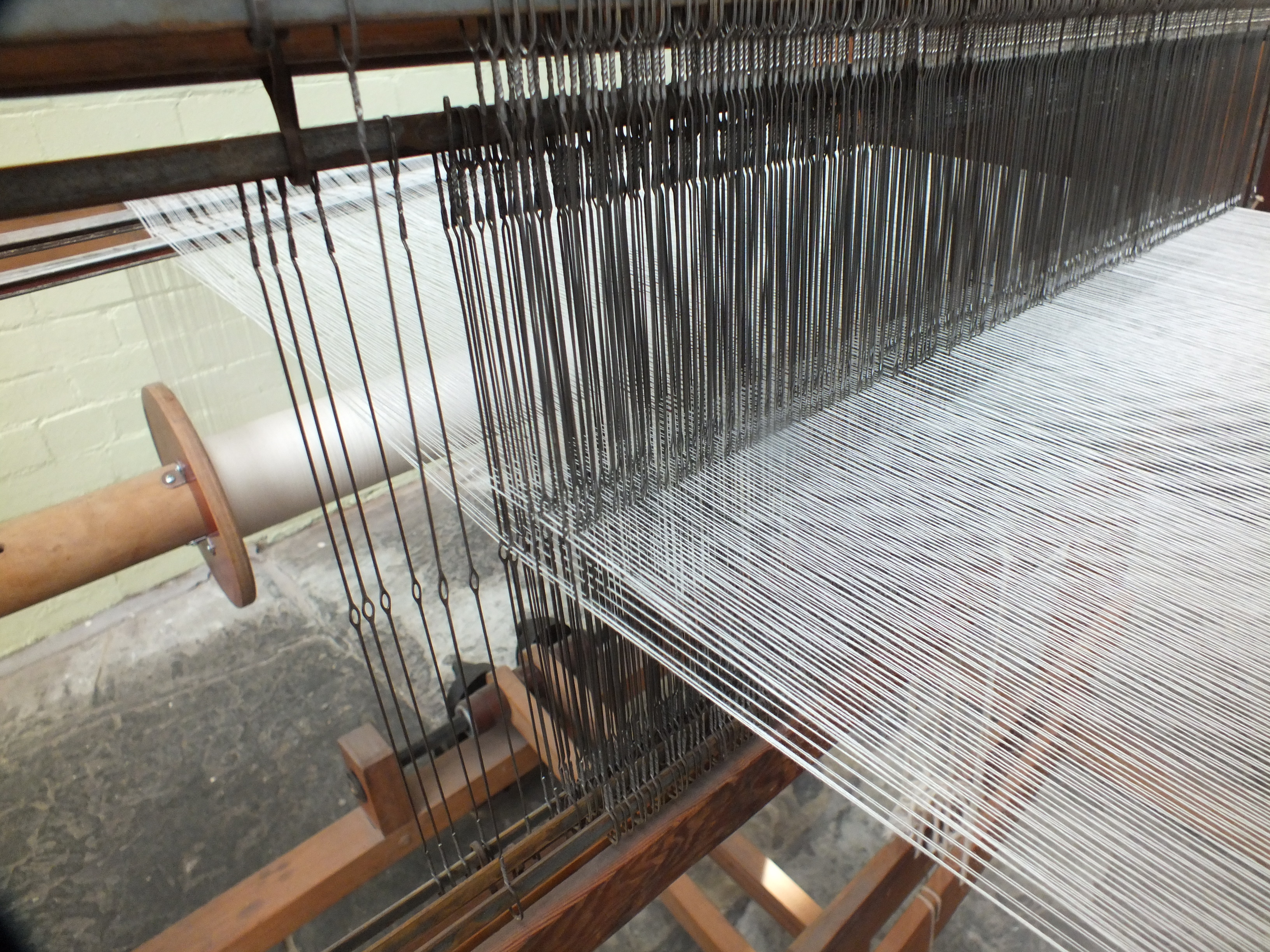
Fully warped, a very slight shed.

Within wire heddles there is a large variety in quality. Heddles should have a smooth eye, with no sharp edges to either catch or fray (and thus weaken) the warp. The warp must be able to slide through the heddle without impairment. The heddle should also be light and not bulky.

There are three common types of metal heddles: wire, inserted eye, and flat steel. The inserted eye are considered to be the best, as they have a smooth eye with no rough ends to catch the warp. Wire heddles are second in quality, followed by the flat steel. Wire heddles look much like the inserted eye heddles, but where in the inserted eye there is a circle of metal for the eye, the wire ones are simply twisted at the top and bottom. The flat metal heddles are considered the poorest in quality as they are heavier and bulkier, as well as not being as smooth. They are a flat piece of steel, with the ends rotated slightly so that the flat side is at an angle of 45 degrees to the shaft. The eye is simply a hole cut in the middle of the piece of metal.

== String heddles ==
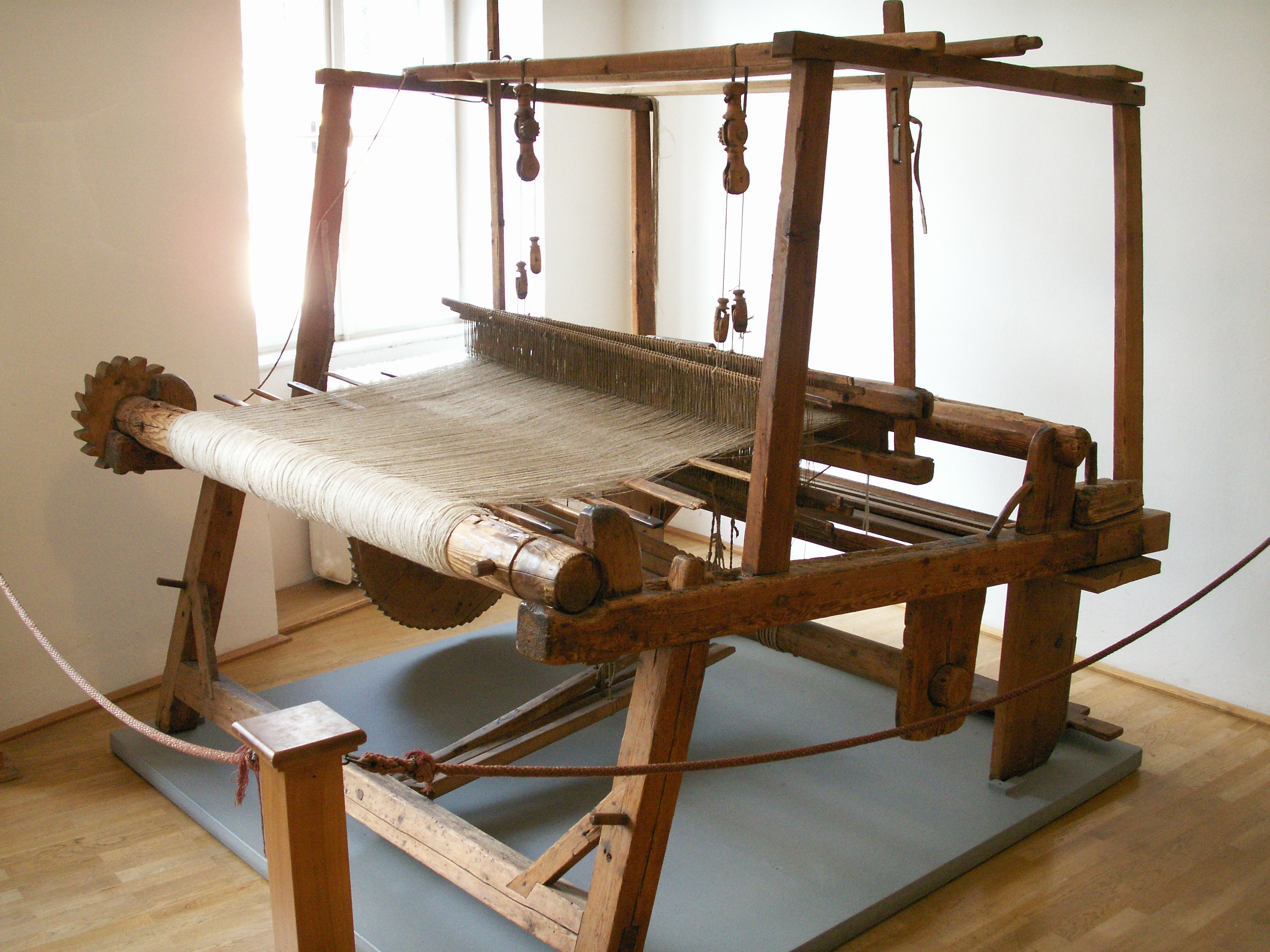
Traditional loom with string heddles

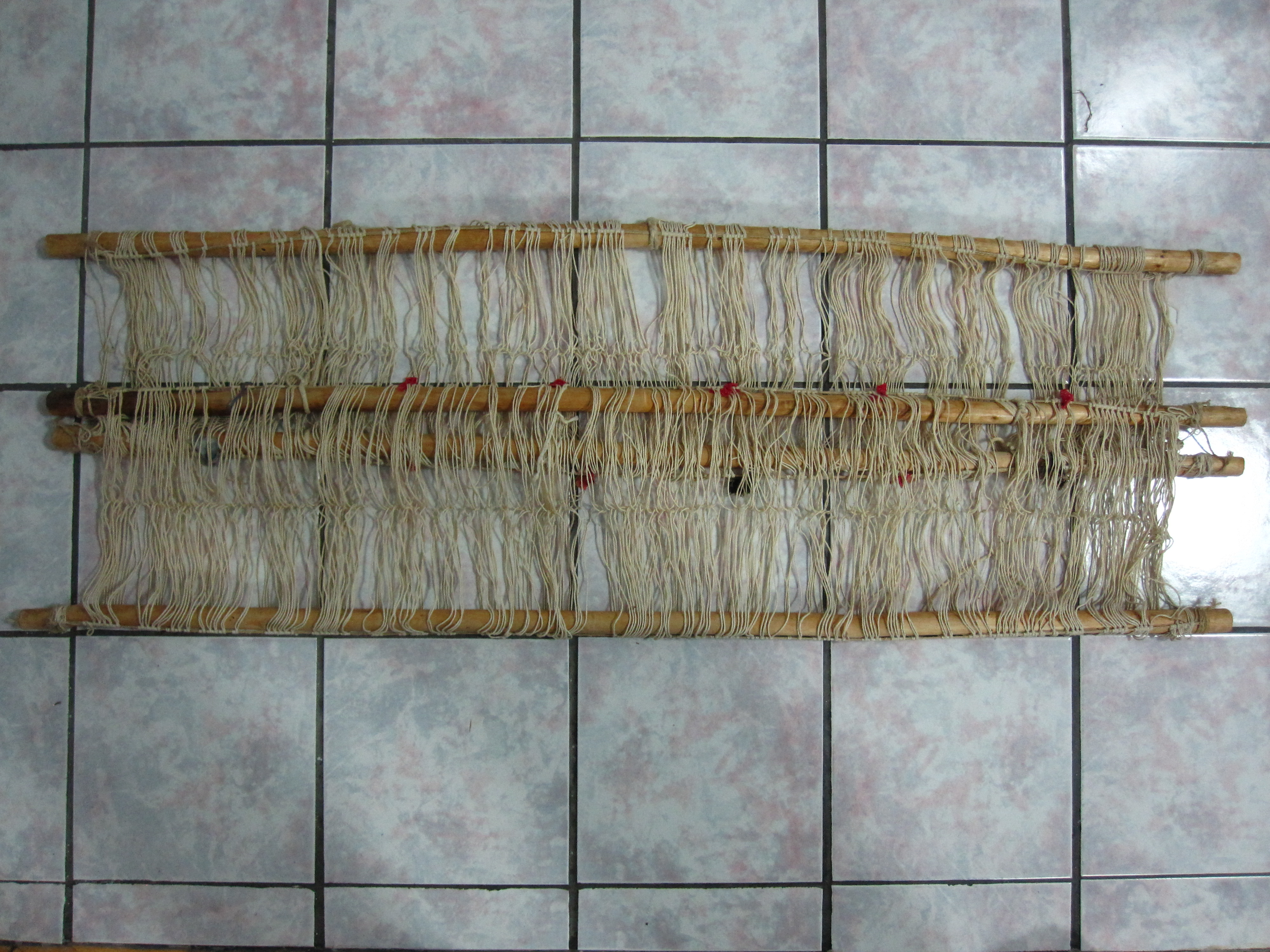
String heddles

Traditional heddles were made of cord. However, cord deteriorates with time and creates friction between the warp and the heddle that can damage the warp. Today, traditional cord heddles are mainly used by historical reenactors.

A very simple string heddle can be made with a series of five knots in a doubled length of cord, which creates five loops. Of these loops, the important ones are the two loops on the ends and the loop in the center. The loops on the ends are used to stretch the heddle between the top and bottom bars of a shaft and are typically just large enough for the heddle to slide along the shaft. The center loop is the eye through which a warp thread is passed and is placed in the center of the heddle. String heddles can also be crocheted, and come in many different forms.

Some modern hand weavers use machine-crocheted polyester heddles. These synthetic heddles minimize some of the problems with traditional knotted string heddles. They are used as an alternative to metal heddles to lessen the weight of the shafts.

=== Inkle looms ===
Inkle loom heddles are generally made of string and consist of a simple loop. Alternating warp threads pass through a heddle, as in a rigid heddle loom.

=== Tapestry loom ===
Tapestry loom heddles are generally made of string. They consist of a loop of string with an eye at one end for the warp thread and a loop at the other for attaching to a heddle bar. See Loom#Heddle-bar.

== Repair heddles ==
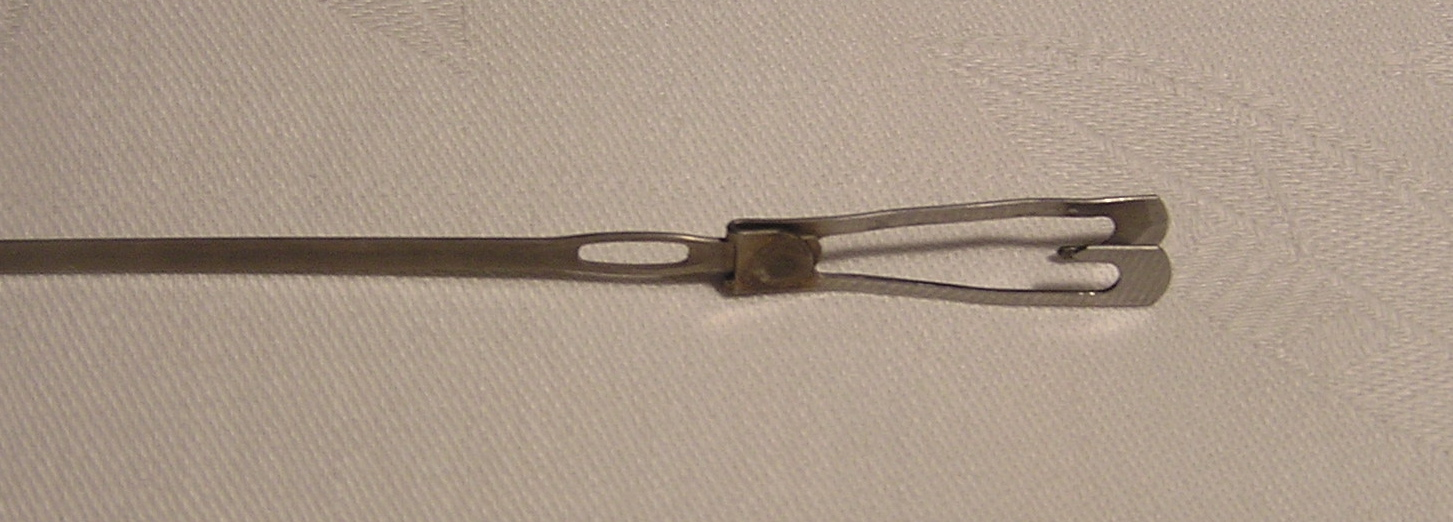
End of a repair heddle

A repair heddle can be used if a heddle breaks, which is rare, or when the loom has been warped incorrectly. If the weaver finds a mistake in the pattern, instead of rethreading all of the threads, a repair heddle can be slipped onto the shaft in the correct location. Thus repair heddles have a method to open the bottom and top loop that holds them onto the shaft. Repair heddles can save a lot of time in fixing a mistake, however they are bulky, in general, and catch on the other heddles.

== Rigid heddles ==
Two types of rigid heddle

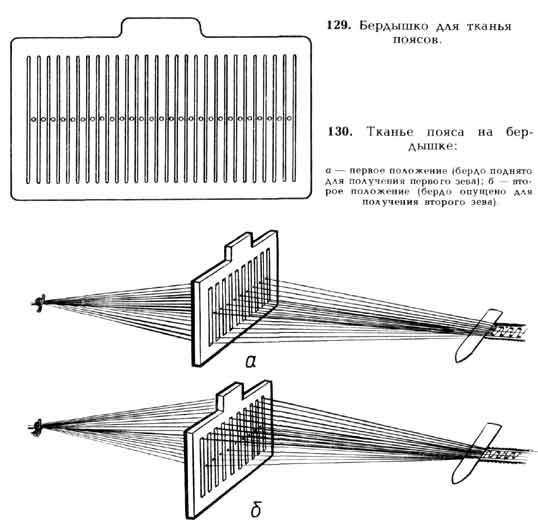
How a rigid heddle works.

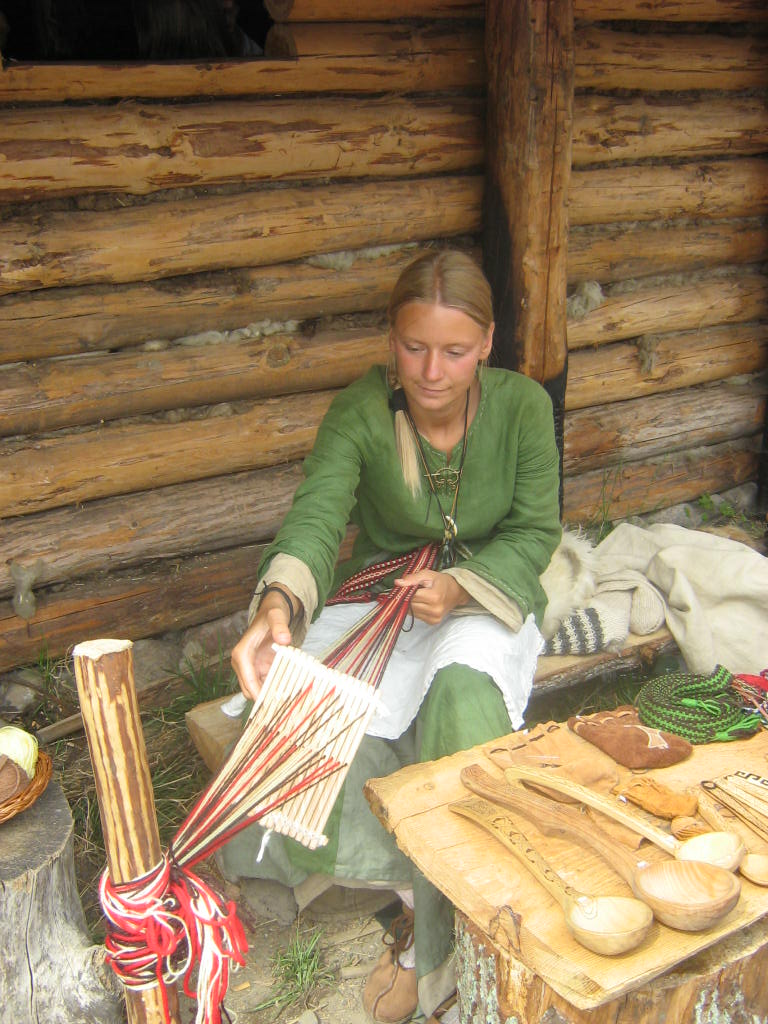
Rigid heddle made of cane, in a single-heddle loom weaving a narrow work band; replica of the European Dark Ages.

In rigid heddle looms there is typically a single shaft, with the heddles fixed in place in the shaft. The warp threads pass alternately through a heddle and through a space between the heddles, so that raising the shaft will raise half the threads (those passing through the heddles), and lowering the shaft will lower the same threads—the threads passing through the spaces between the heddles remain in place.

Rigid heddles are thus very different from the heddle in common use, though the single heddle derived from the rigid heddle. The advantage of non-rigid heddles is that the weaver has more freedom, and can create a wider variety of fabrics. Rigid heddle looms resemble the standard floor loom in appearance.

=== Single and double heddle looms ===
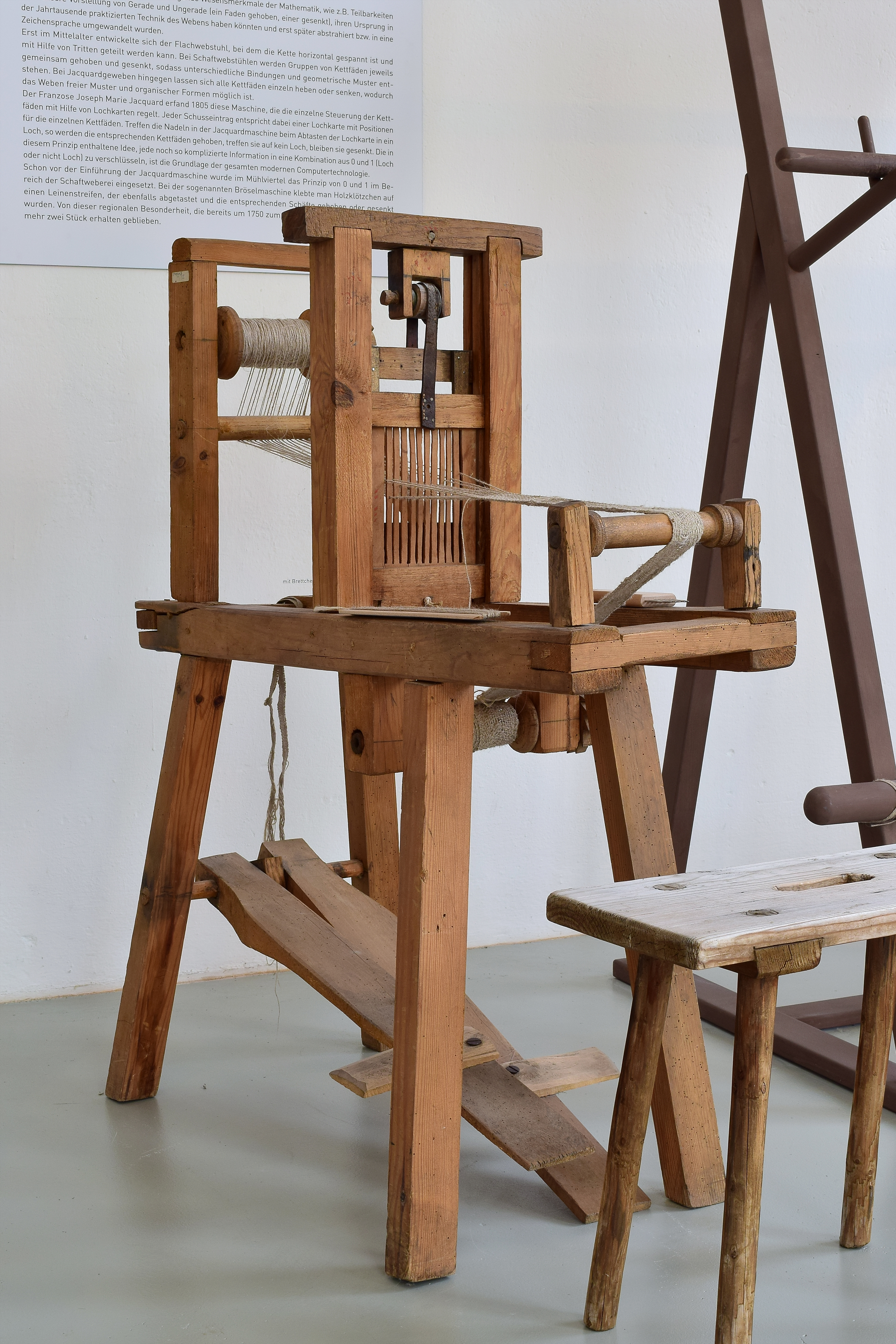
An inkle loom with a single rigid heddle, moved by treadles and a pulley; a second heddle could easily be added.

Single and double heddle looms are types of rigid heddle loom, in that the heddles are all together. Heddles are normally suspended above the loom. The weaver operates them by pedals and works while seated.

Among hand woven African textiles, single-heddle looms are in wide use among weaving regions of Africa. Mounting position varies according to local custom. Double-heddle looms are used in West Africa, Ethiopia and in Madagascar for the production of lamba cloth.

== See also ==
- Loom#Shedding methods
