= Piqué (weaving) =

Woven fabric with a raised rib

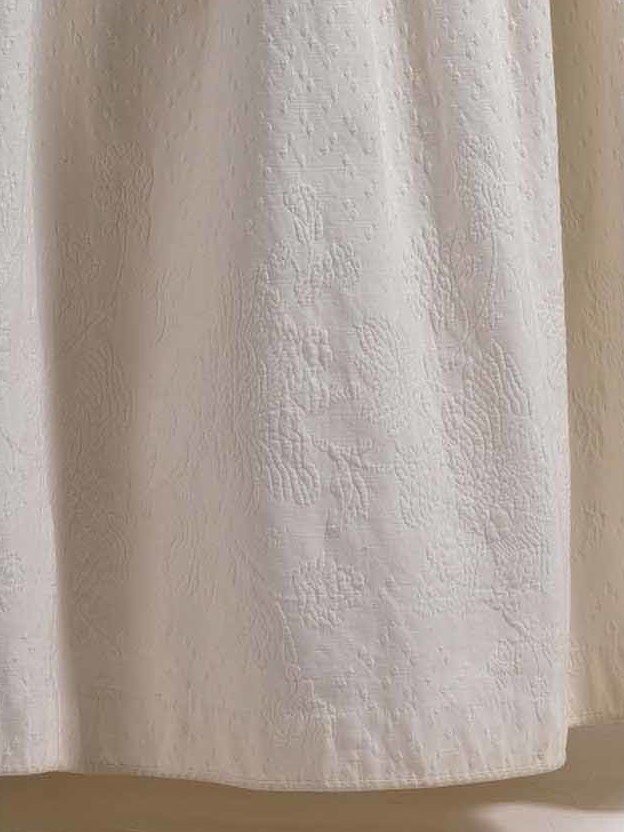
1830s white cotton marcella skirt.

Piqué, or marcella, is a weaving style normally used with cotton yarn which is characterised by raised parallel cords or geometric designs in the fabric. Piqué fabrics vary from semi-sheer dimity to heavy weight waffle cloth. Twilled cotton and corded cotton are close relatives.

== Etymology ==
Late 18th-century fabrics in this style were considered to imitate hand-made quilts. The name piqué was thus borrowed directly from French, in which the verb piquer (‘to prick’) also described the act of sewing a quilt.

== Piqué weave ==
The weave is closely associated with white tie, and some accounts even say the fabric was invented specifically for this use. It holds more starch than plain fabric, so produces a stiffer shirt front; piqué shirts would go on to replace earlier plain-weave fronts, which remain a valid alternative. Use of piqué then spread to other parts of formal dress code, and it is now the most common fabric used in the tie and waistcoat of white tie dress.

=== Piqué weaving ===
Piqué weaving was developed by the Lancashire cotton industry in the late 18th century as a mechanised technique of weaving double cloth with an enclosed heavy cording weft. It was originally used to make imitations of the corded Provençal quilts made in Marseille, the manufacture of which became an important industry for Lancashire from the late 18th to the early 20th century. The term "marcella", another name for piqué, is one of a number of variations on the word "Marseille".

== Fabrics ==
=== Woven piqué ===
Piqué fabrics are a type of dobby construction. Piqués may be constructed in various patterns such as cord, waffle, honeycomb and birdseye. These fabrics require the addition of extra yarns, called stuffer yarns. These stuffer yarns are incorporated into the back of the fabric to give texture and added depth to the fabric design. Some piqués may be made using the Jacquard attachment on the loom. Although made of 100% cotton today, cotton-silk blends and even pure silk versions were made in the past and in a variety of weaves.
