= Dharmavaram silk sari =

Hand-woven textiles

Dharmavaram Silk Sarees
- Geographical indication
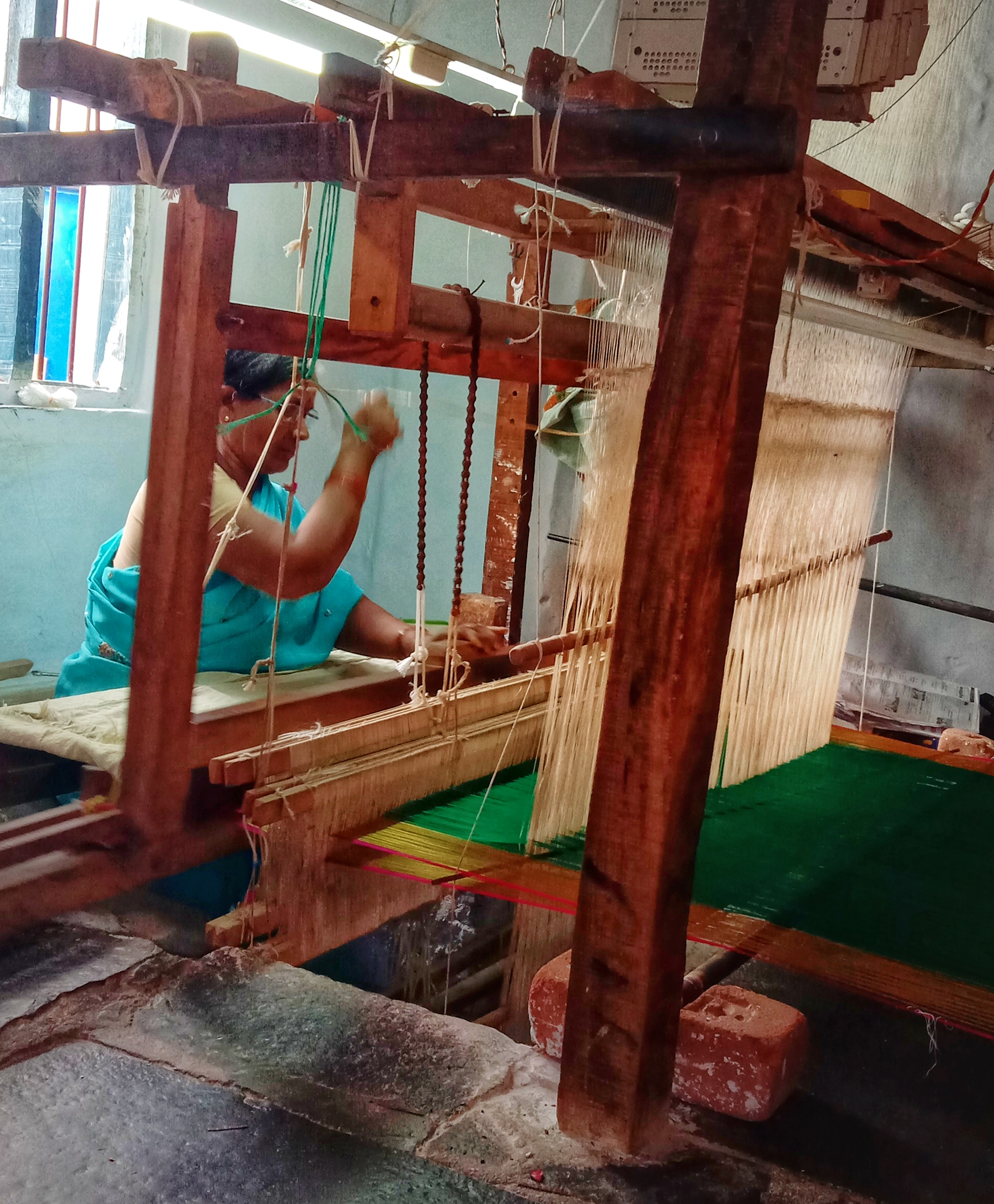
- Women at work in Dharmavaram
- Type: Textile
- Area: Dharmavaram, Sri Sathya Sai district, Andhra Pradesh
- Country: India
- Material: Mulberry silk: Zari

Dharmavaram silk saris are textiles woven by hand with mulberry silk and zari. They are made in Dharmavaram of Sri Sathya Sai district in the Indian state of Andhra Pradesh. It was registered as one of the geographical indication from Andhra Pradesh by Geographical Indications of Goods (Registration and Protection) Act, 1999.

== History ==
Kriya Shakthi Vodavaru Swamy named Dharmavaram after the name of his mother, Dharmambai in the year 1153–54 AD. By 19th century, silk handloom industry emerged as the main occupation. Paintings on the roof wall of Lepakshi temple and Latha Mandapam depicts the designs of Dharmavaram saris.

== Stages of production ==
The production of the Dharmavaram saris and Paavadas includes different stages which includes:

- Raw materials – pure Mulberry silk in yarn form or raw silk, zari threads of red, green, silver and gold, acid dyes, soap and soda for degumming, water
- Quality of silk – cocoons are boiled in steam to obtain yarn and Denier silk and undergoes twisting and formation of warp and weft.
- Degumming of silk purification – process involves boiling of yarn with soda ash and soap to remove natural gums.
- Plying of Yarn – Plying of yarn is done to create a balanced yarn which is done for both sari and pavadas.
- Dyeing – usage of acid dyes for shades from rainbow colors, plied yarn absorbs dye in hot water, the entire process involves certain aspects like liquor ratio, temperature, chemicals in dye, pH etc. Kuttu Dharmavaram sari weaving involves Tie and dye method
- Drying – after the above process, the yarn is dried indoor on bamboo sticks.

Pre-loom process

- Winding of hank yarn into warp and weft – charka, shift bamboo and bobbin are used to form warp. While, the weft is made with help of a pirn.
- Street sizing – the warp extension, spraying of rice conjee ensures suitable weaving followed by drying.
- Weaving process – it involves Warp and Weft method of weaving and sometimes replaced by Jacquard weaving and Dobby. Usage of only pitlooms for weaving and no powerlooms and petni technique.
- Cutting and folding – designing and cutting per the goods demand for marketing take place

== Usage ==
The saris are worn in winter or cold conditions, for functions, and are mostly used by dancers of Bharatanatyam and Kuchipudi.
