= Corded quilting =

Decorative quilting technique

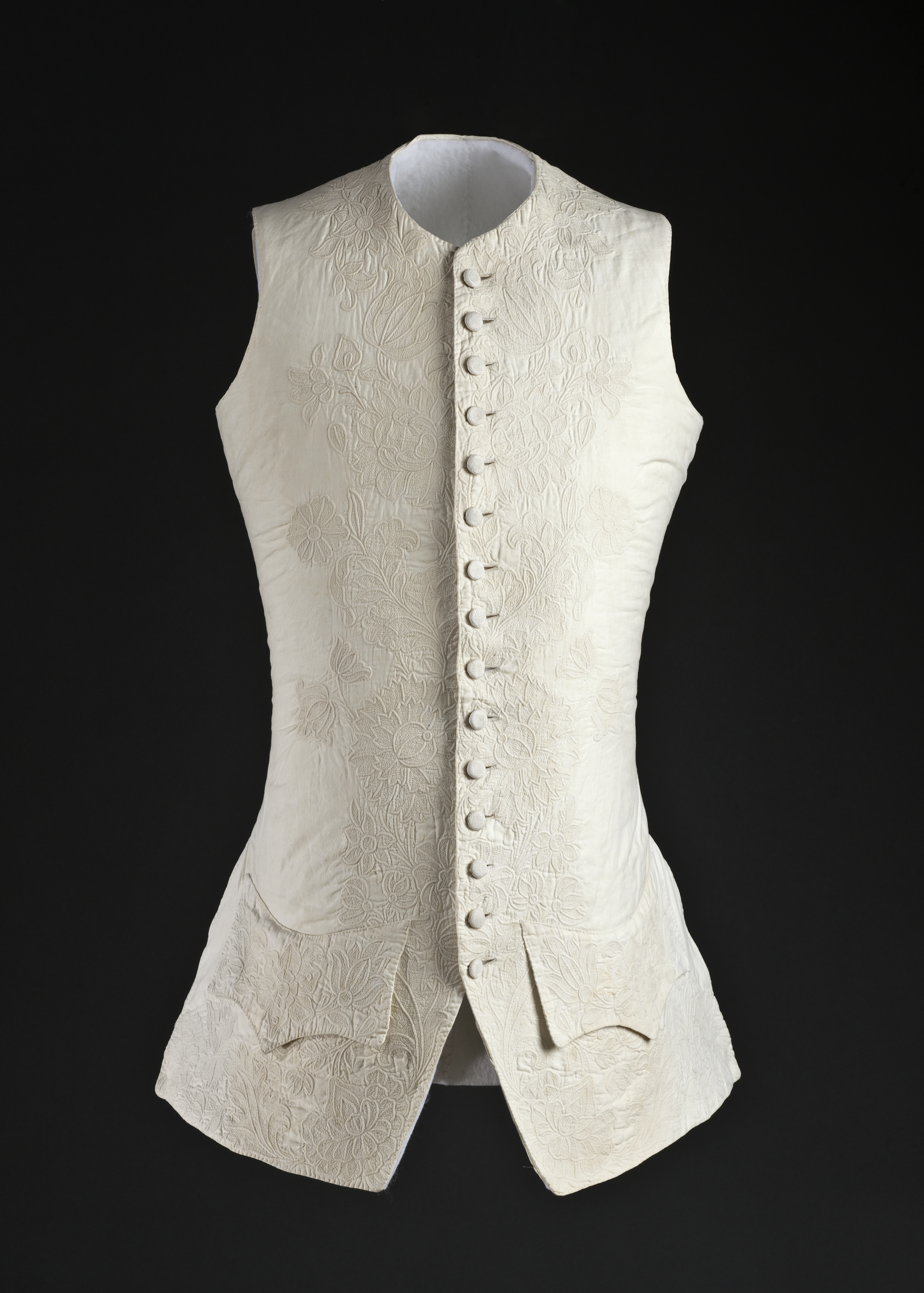
Man's waistcoat decorated with floral designs in corded quilting. Probably English, c. 1760. Los Angeles County Museum of Art, M.2007.211.813.

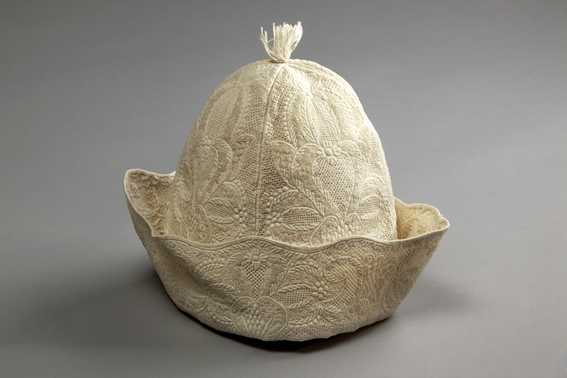
c. 1725 – c. 1750. Centraal Museum Utrecht

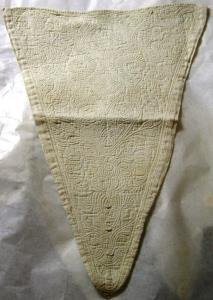
18th century. Amsterdam Museum.

Corded quilting (also known as Marseilles quilting, Marseilles embroidery, marcella, or Zaans stitchwork) is a decorative quilting technique popular from the late 17th through the early 19th centuries. In corded quilting, a fine fabric, sometimes colored silk but more often white linen or cotton, is backed with a loosely woven fabric. Floral or other motifs are outlined in parallel rows of running stitches or backstitches to form channels, and soft cotton cord is inserted through the backing fabric using a blunt needle and drawn along the quilted channels to produce a raised effect. Tiny quilting stitches in closely spaced rows fill the motifs and provide contrast to the corded outlines.

Corded quilting was popular for dresses, petticoats, and waistcoats as well as curtains and bedcoverings. Originating in the fine whole-cloth quilt tradition of Provence in southern France, corded quilting differs from the related trapunto quilting in which loose wadding or batting rather than cord is inserted to create raised designs. By the Federal era in America, corded quilting and trapunto were combined with whitework embroidery and other needlework techniques to produce a profusion of white-on-white textiles for the home before the fashion faded.

The principal areas of production using this technique were southern France and Italy.
