= Provençal quilts =

Wholecloth quilts using stuffing technique traditionally made in the South of France

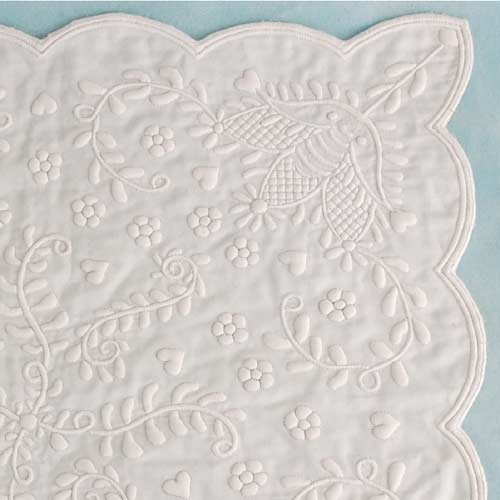
Detail of a white cotton boutis quilt

The term Provençal quilting, also known as boutis, refers to the wholecloth quilts done using a stuffing technique traditionally made in the South of France from the 17th century onwards. Boutis is a Provençal word meaning 'stuffing', describing how two layers of fabric are quilted together with stuffing sandwiched between sections of the design, creating a raised effect. The three main forms of the Provençal quilt are matelassage, piqûre de Marseilles (also known as Marseilles work or piqué marseillais), and boutis. These terms, along with trapunto are often debated and confused, but they are all forms of stuffed quilting associated with the region.

== History (pre-17th century) ==
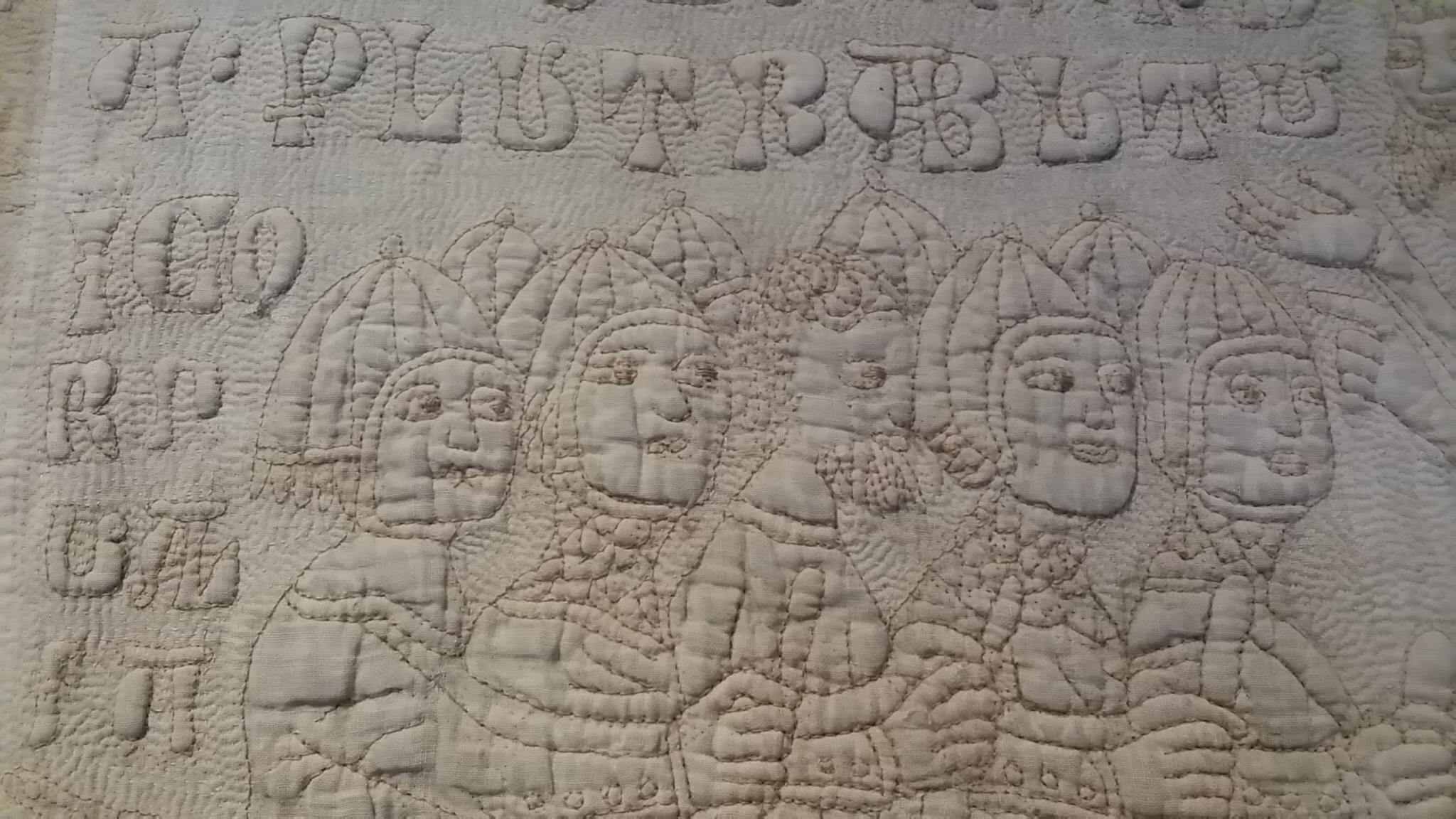
Detail of the Tristan Quilt

Stuffed quilting, or trapunto, was known in Sicily as early as the 13th century. One of the earliest surviving examples of trapunto quilting is the 1360-1400 Tristan Quilt, a Sicilian quilted linen textile surviving as two fragments, representing scenes from the story of Tristan and Isolde; one part of which is housed in the Victoria and Albert Museum and the other in the Bargello in Florence.

== Techniques ==
=== Matelassage ===
The first whole-cloth stuffed quilts to be made in the southern region of France were matelassage quilts in the mid-17th century. These sandwiched a layer of wadding, also known as padding, between two outer layers of fabric, which were then quilted together using a running stitch. Matelassage quilts were successfully exported from the South of France to England, Spain, Italy, Germany and the Netherlands.

=== Piqûre de Marseilles ===
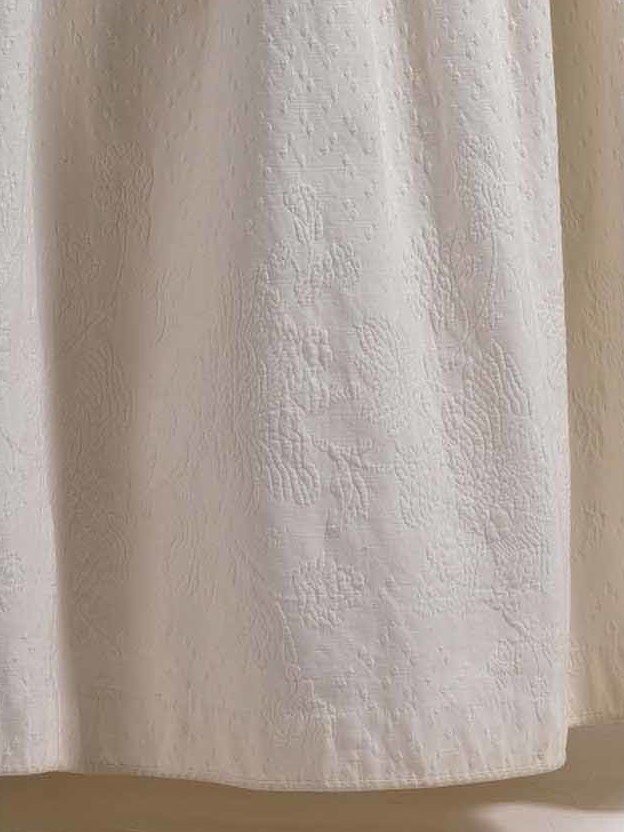
1830s marcella skirt

Also known as corded quilting, Marseilles work or piqué marseillais, this technique was developed in Marseille in the early eighteenth century, and became an important local industry. The two layers of plain fabric are stretched together without wadding, and intricately stitched together using backstitch, or after the mid-18th century, the more swiftly achieved running stitch. There were narrow channels in the embroidered design through which fine cord or rolled fabric was threaded using a special needle to create a three-dimensional effect.

In the late 18th century the Lancashire cotton industry developed a mechanised technique of weaving double cloth with an enclosed heavy cording weft. The resulting imitation Marseille quilts became an important industry for Lancashire from the late 18th to the early 20th century. These textiles are also known as marcella, one of a number of variations on the word "Marseille".

=== Boutis ===
Boutis quilts, as they are known today evolved in the 19th century from the earlier Provençal quilting techniques. They represent a simplification of the Marseille technique where the motifs in the quilting are larger and the stuffing bulkier. The boutis quilt may feature various images and symbols in its design, such as religious symbols, oak leaves, flowers, fruits and berries, animals, and cornucopia; it might also include naive motifs drawn from the maker's personal life. The term "boutis" is now widely used as a general term for all forms of Provençal stuffed quilting, with La Maison du Boutis (The Boutis House) in Calvisson acting as a museum dedicated to traditional Provençal embroidery & quilting techniques. The special boxwood needle used for stuffing the motifs is also known as a boutis.
