= Albert cloth =

Type of double cloth

Albert cloth is a heavy woollen material with different colors or patterns on either side. The cloth has alternative names such as "plaid-back coverts" and "golf cloth". Albert cloth is a double weave fabric, made using a method of weaving in which two layers of fabric are woven simultaneously. It is a reversible, warm material, and useful for overcoats and cloaks.

== See also ==
- Biretz
