= Joseph Marie Jacquard =

French weaver, merchant, and inventor (1752–1834)

- Copy after Claude Bonnefond, 1850s
- Born: Joseph Marie Charles; 7 July 1752; Lyon, Lyonnais, Kingdom of France
- Died: 7 August 1834 (aged 82); Oullins, Rhône, Kingdom of France
- Occupations: Merchant, weaver, inventor
- Known for: Programmable loom

Signature
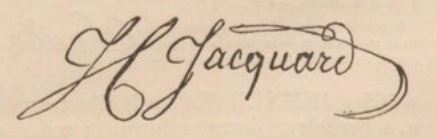

Joseph Marie Charles dit (called or nicknamed) Jacquard (/ˈdʒækɑːrd, dʒəˈkɑːrd/; French: [ʒakaʁ]; 7 July 1752 – 7 August 1834) was a French weaver and merchant. He played an important role in the development of the earliest programmable loom (the "Jacquard loom"), which in turn played an important role in the development of other programmable machines, such as an early version of digital compiler used by IBM to develop the modern day computer.

== Life ==
In his grandfather's generation, several branches of the Charles family lived in Lyon's Couzon-Au-Mont d’Or suburb (on Lyon's north side, along the Saône River). To distinguish the various branches, the community gave them nicknames; Joseph's branch was called "Jacquard" Charles. Thus, Joseph's grandfather was Bartholomew Charles dit [called] Jacquard.

Joseph Marie Charles dit Jacquard was born into a conservative Catholic family in Lyon, France, on 7 July 1752. He was one of nine children of Jean Charles dit Jacquard, a master weaver of Lyon, and his wife, Antoinette Rive. However, only Joseph and his sister Clémence (born 7 November 1747) survived to adulthood. Although his father was a man of property, Joseph received no formal schooling and remained illiterate until he was 13. He was finally taught by his brother-in-law, Jean-Marie Barret, who ran a printing and book selling business. Barret also introduced Joseph to learned societies and scholars. Joseph initially helped his father operate his loom, but the work proved too arduous, so Jacquard was placed first with a bookbinder and then with a maker of printers' type.

His mother died in 1762, and when his father died in 1772, Joseph inherited his father's house, looms and workshop as well as a vineyard and quarry in Couzon-au-Mont d’Or. Joseph then dabbled in real estate. In 1778, he listed his occupations as master weaver and silk merchant. Jacquard's occupation at this time is problematic because by 1780 most silk weavers did not work independently; instead, they worked for wages from silk merchants, and Jacquard was not registered as a silk merchant in Lyon.

There is some confusion about Jacquard's early work history. British economist Sir John Bowring met Jacquard, who told Bowring that at one time he had been a maker of straw hats. Eymard claimed that before becoming involved in the weaving of silk, Jacquard was a type-founder (a maker of printers' type), a soldier, a bleacher (blanchisseur) of straw hats, and a lime burner (a maker of lime for mortar). Barlow claims that before marrying, Jacquard had worked for a bookbinder, a type-founder, and a maker of cutlery. After marrying, Jacquard tried cutlery making, type-founding, and weaving. However, Barlow does not cite any sources for that information.

On 26 July 1778, Joseph married Claudine Boichon. She was a middle-class widow from Lyon who owned property and had a substantial dowry. However, Joseph soon fell deeply into debt and was brought to court. Barlow claims that after Jacquard's father died, Jacquard started a figure-weaving business but failed and lost all his wealth. However, Barlow cites no sources to support his claim. To settle his debts, he was obliged to sell his inheritance and to appropriate his wife's dowry. His wife retained a house in Oullins (on Lyon's south side, along the Rhone River), where the couple resided. On 19 April 1779, the couple had their only child, a son, Jean Marie. Charles Ballot stated that after the rebellion of Lyon in 1793 was suppressed, Joseph and his son escaped from the city by joining the revolutionary army. They fought together in the Rhine campaign of 1795, serving in the Rhone-and-Loire battalion under General Jean Charles Pichegru. Joseph's son was killed outside of Heidelberg. However, Ballot repeated rumors and was a sloppy historian. For example, he stated that Jacquard's wife Claudette Boichon was the daughter of Antoine-Hélon Boichon, a master swordsmith, whereas Claudette was a widow who had been married to a Mr. Boichon before she married Jacquard.

By 1800, Joseph began inventing various devices. He invented a treadle loom in 1800, a loom to weave fishing nets in 1803, and starting in 1804, the "Jacquard" loom, which would weave patterned silk automatically. However, these early inventions did not operate well and thus were unsuccessful.

In 1801, Jacquard exhibited his invention at the Exposition des produits de l'industrie française in Paris, where he was awarded a bronze medal. In 1803 he was summoned to Paris and attached to the Conservatoire des Arts et Metiers. A loom by Jacques de Vaucanson on display there suggested various improvements in his own, which he gradually perfected to its final state. The loom was declared public property in 1805, and Jacquard was rewarded with a pension and a royalty on each machine. Although his invention was fiercely opposed by the silk-weavers, who feared that its introduction, owing to the saving of labour, would deprive them of their livelihood, its advantages secured its general adoption, and by 1812 there were 11,000 Jacquard looms in use in France. This claim has been challenged: Initially few Jacquard looms were sold because of problems with the punched card mechanism. Only after 1815 — once Jean Antoine Breton had solved the problems with the punched card mechanism — did sales of looms increase.

Jacquard died at Oullins (Rhône), 7 August 1834. Six years later, a statue was erected to him in Lyon, on the site where his 1801 exhibit loom was destroyed.

== Jacquard machine ==
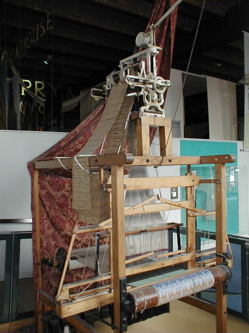
Jacquard loom on display in the Museum of Science and Industry in Manchester, England

The Jacquard Loom is a mechanical loom that uses pasteboard cards with punched holes, each card corresponding to one row of the design. Multiple rows of holes are punched in the cards and the many cards that compose the design of the textile are strung together in order. It is based on earlier inventions by the Frenchmen Basile Bouchon (1725), Jean-Baptiste Falcon (1728) and Jacques Vaucanson (1740).

To understand the Jacquard loom, some basic knowledge of weaving is necessary. Parallel threads (the "warp") are stretched across a rectangular frame (the "loom"). For plain cloth, every other warp thread is raised. Another thread (the "weft thread") is then passed (at a right angle to the warp) through the space (the "shed") between the lower and the upper warp threads. Then the raised warp threads are lowered, the alternate warp threads are raised, and the weft thread is passed through the shed in the opposite direction. With hundreds of such cycles, the cloth is gradually created.

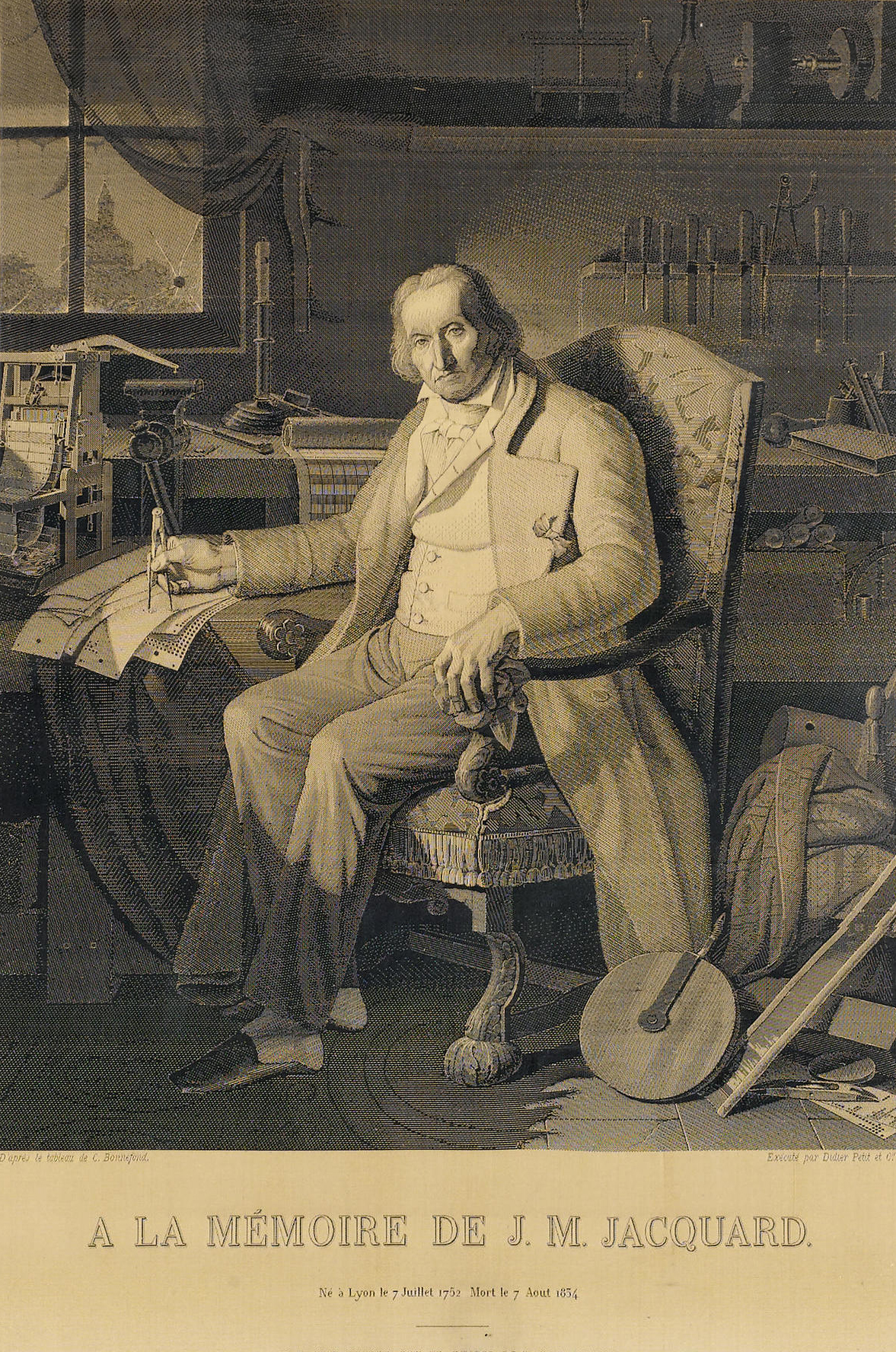
The Most Famous Image in the Early History of Computing This portrait of Jacquard was woven in silk on a Jacquard loom and required 24,000 punched cards to create (1839). It was only produced to order. One of these portraits in the possession of Charles Babbage inspired him in using perforated cards in his Analytical Engine. It is in the collection of the Science Museum in London, England.

By raising different (not just alternate) warp threads and using colored threads in the weft, the texture, color, design, and pattern can be varied to create varied and highly desirable fabrics. Weaving elaborate patterns or designs manually is a slow, complicated procedure subject to error. Jacquard's loom was intended to automate this process.

Jacquard was not the first to try to automate the process of weaving. In 1725 Basile Bouchon invented an attachment for draw looms that used a broad strip of punched paper to select the warp threads that would be raised during weaving. Specifically, Bouchon's innovation involved a row of hooks. The curved portion of each hook snagged a string that could raise one of the warp threads, whereas the straight portion of each hook pressed against the punched paper, which was draped around a perforated cylinder. Whenever the hook pressed against the solid paper, pushing the cylinder forward would raise the corresponding warp thread; whereas whenever the hook met a hole in the paper, pushing the cylinder forward would allow the hook to slip inside the cylinder and the corresponding warp thread would not be raised. Bouchon's loom was unsuccessful because it could handle only a modest number of warp threads.

By 1737, a master silk weaver of Lyon, Jean Falcon, had increased the number of warp threads that the loom could handle automatically. He developed an attachment for looms in which Bouchon's paper strip was replaced by a chain of punched cards, which could deflect multiple rows of hooks simultaneously. Like Bouchon, Falcon used a "cylinder" (actually, a four-sided perforated tube) to hold each card in place while it was pressed against the rows of hooks. His loom was modestly successful; about 40 such looms had been sold by 1762.

In 1741, Jacques de Vaucanson, a French inventor who designed and built automated mechanical toys, was appointed inspector of silk factories. Between 1747 and 1750, he tried to automate Bouchon's mechanism. In Vaucanson's mechanism, the hooks that were to lift the warp threads were selected by long pins or "needles", which were pressed against a sheet of punched paper that was draped around a perforated cylinder. Specifically, each hook passed at a right angle through an eyelet of a needle. When the cylinder was pressed against the array of needles, some of the needles, pressing against solid paper, would move forward, which in turn would tilt the corresponding hooks. The hooks that were tilted would not be raised, so the warp threads that were snagged by those hooks would remain in place; however, the hooks that were not tilted, would be raised, and the warp threads that were snagged by those hooks would also be raised. By placing his mechanism above the loom, Vaucanson eliminated the complicated system of weights and cords (tail cords, simple, pulley box, etc.) that had been used to select which warp threads were to be raised during weaving. Vaucanson also added a ratchet mechanism to advance the punched paper each time that the cylinder was pushed against the row of hooks. However, Vaucanson's loom was not successful, probably because, like Bouchon's mechanism, it could not control enough warp threads to make sufficiently elaborate patterns to justify the cost of the mechanism.

To stimulate the French textile industry, which was competing with Britain's industrialized industry, Napoleon Bonaparte placed large orders for Lyon's silk, starting in 1802. In 1804, at the urging of Lyon fabric maker and inventor Gabriel Dutillieu, Jacquard studied Vaucanson's loom, which was stored at the Conservatoire des Arts et Métiers in Paris. By 1805 Jacquard had eliminated the paper strip from Vaucanson's mechanism and returned to using Falcon's chain of punched cards.

The potential of Jacquard's loom was immediately recognized. On 12 April 1805, Emperor Napoleon and Empress Josephine visited Lyon and viewed Jacquard's new loom. On 15 April 1805, the emperor granted the patent for Jacquard's loom to the city of Lyon. In return, Jacquard received a lifelong pension of 3,000 francs; furthermore, he received a royalty of 50 francs for each loom that was bought and used during the period from 1805 to 1811.

== See also ==
- List of pioneers in computer science
