= Matelassé =

Weaving or stitching technique

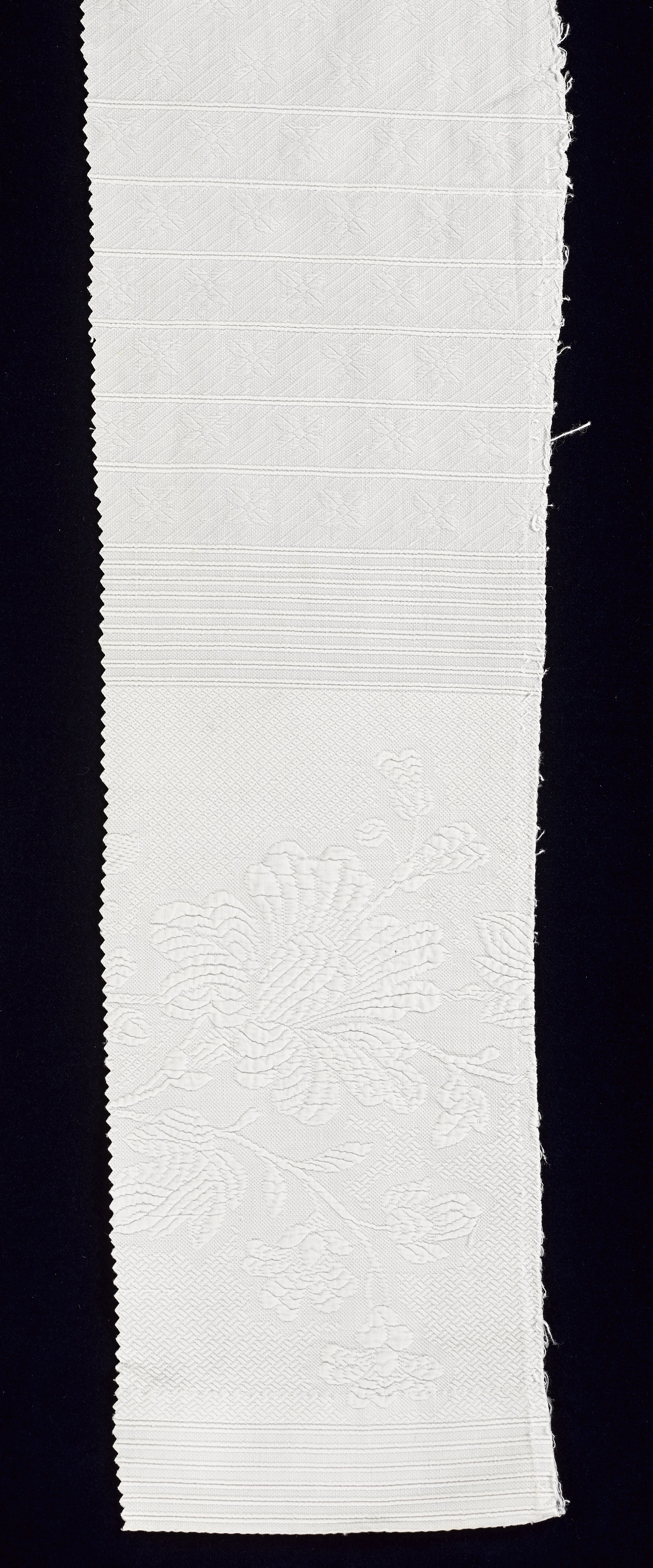
Matelassé woven fabric. Study Collection, ST509, ModeMuseum Provincie Antwerpen.

Matelassé (French: [matlase]) is a weaving or stitching technique yielding a pattern that appears quilted or padded. Matelassé may be achieved by hand, on a jacquard loom, or using a quilting machine. It is meant to mimic the style of hand-stitched quilts made in Marseille, France. It is a heavy, thick textile that appears to be padded but actually has no padding within the fabric.
