= Emanuel Anthony Posselt =

Emanuel Anthony Posselt (1858 – June 28, 1921) was an authority on Jacquard looms and weaving. His book on the Jacquard machine is considered to be a classic.

== Biography ==
Posselt, the son of Emanuel Anthony and Elizabeth (Demuth) Posselt, was born in Reichenberg, Austrian Empire (current Liberec, Czech Republic) on 21 August 1858. Emanuel graduated in 1876 from the Imperial Government Weaving School, also in Reichenberg. During the next two years, he visited most of the important textile manufacturing cities in Europe, and during this time he managed his father's textile mills. In August 1878, he went to the United States, where he worked until 1884 for various textile mills in New England and Pennsylvania.

In 1884, Posselt became the inaugural director of the textile division of Pennsylvania Museum and School of Industrial Art. In 1891, he resigned that position to accept the editorship of the Textile Record of North America, at the time a leading trade journal.

Posselt then established a private textile academy and a textile trade book business. He published his own work on the Jacquard machine, the technology of textile design, textile calculations, and cotton, wool and silk industries; as well as works by other authors, such as Gardner on wool dyeing. The series Hand Books of the Textile Industry and Posselt's Textile Library, as well as Posselt's Textile Journal that ran between 1907 and 1923, are his own. The last was the immediate forerunner of Textile World.

Posselt died in Philadelphia on June 28, 1921, and is buried in Greenmount Cemetery.

== Family ==
Posselt married in July 1884 at Colchester, Vermont Anna Clera Pollinger, by whom he had three children: Anna (1896), Elwood (1906) and Gertrude (1908).
