= Biretz =

Double-faced fabric with a twill pattern on one side and a cord pattern on the other

Biretz, also known as “electoral cloth”, was a double cloth with a twill pattern on one side and a cord pattern on the other. It was a reversible construction. Biretz was made from wool, silk or other wool combinations. The material was used to make dresses.

== Empress cloth ==
There were napped, and corded variants also, called Empress cloth named after Empress Eugenia.

== See also ==
- Albert cloth
- Eugénie hat, the original Eugénie hat was named after Eugénie de Montijo, wife of Napoleon III, whose fashion choices were publicized in fashion sketches and closely scrutinized across Europe and the United States.
