= Basile Bouchon =

18th-century French inventor

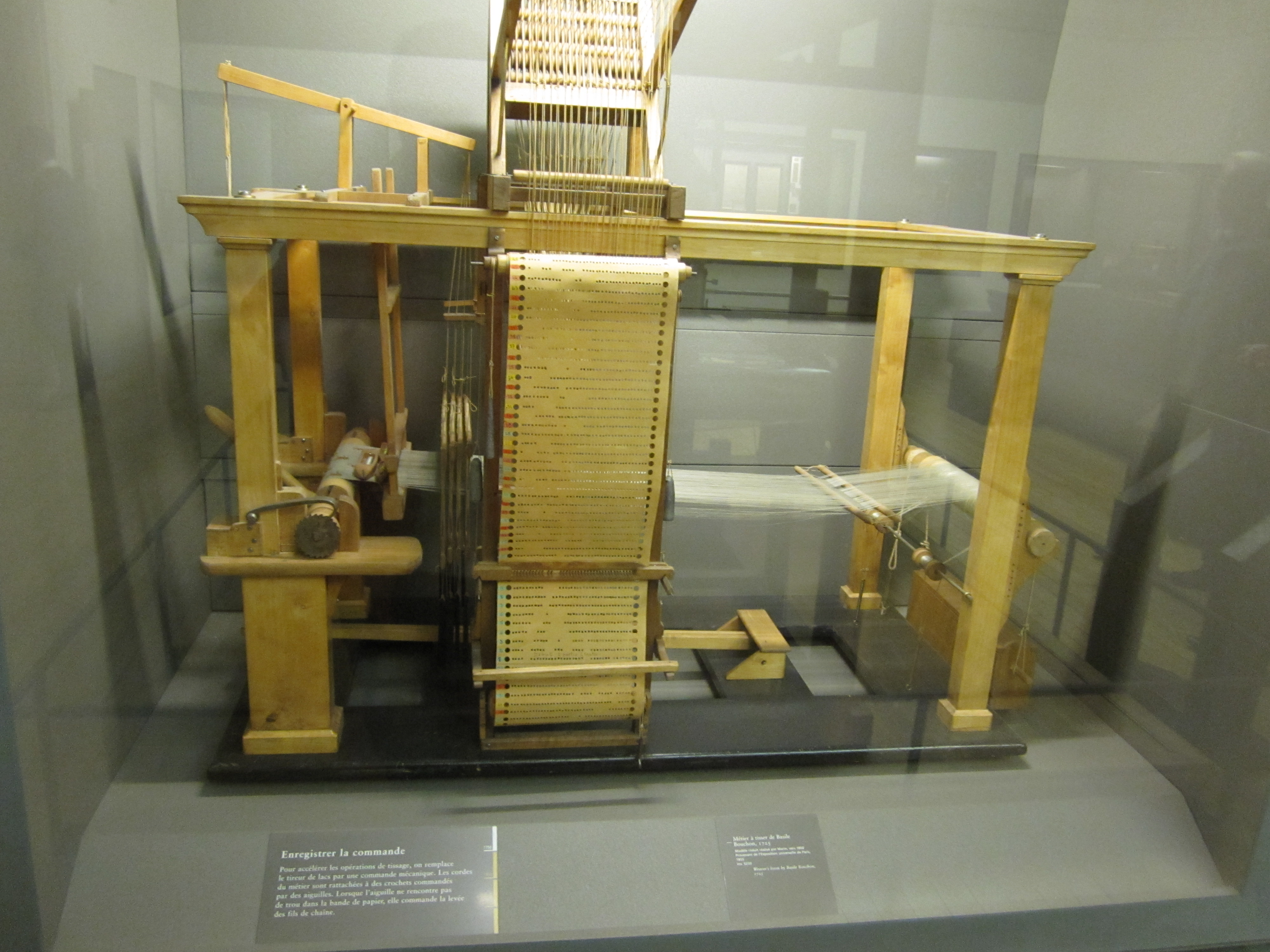
Bouchon's 1725 loom on display at the Musée des Arts et Métiers, Paris

Basile Bouchon (French: [basil buʃɔ̃]) (or Boachon) was a textile worker in the silk center in Lyon who invented a way to control a loom with a perforated paper roll in 1725. The son of an organ maker, Bouchon partially automated the tedious setting up process of the drawloom in which an operator lifted the warp threads using cords.

This development is considered to be the first industrial application of a semi-automated machine.

The cords of the warp were passed through the eyes of horizontal needles arranged to slide in a box. These were either raised or not depending on whether there was not or was a hole in the roll at that point. This was similar to the piano roll developed at the end of the 19th century and may have been inspired by the patterns that were traditionally drawn on squared paper.

Three years later, his assistant Jean-Baptiste Falcon expanded the number of cords that could be handled by arranging the holes in rows and using rectangular cards that were joined together in an endless loop.

Though this eliminated mistakes in the lifting of threads, it still needed an extra operator to control it and the first attempt at automation was made by Jacques Vaucanson in 1745. But it was not until 1805 that the wildly successful Jacquard mechanism was finally produced.
