= Dobby (cloth) =

Fabric woven on a dobby loom, with small geometric patterns

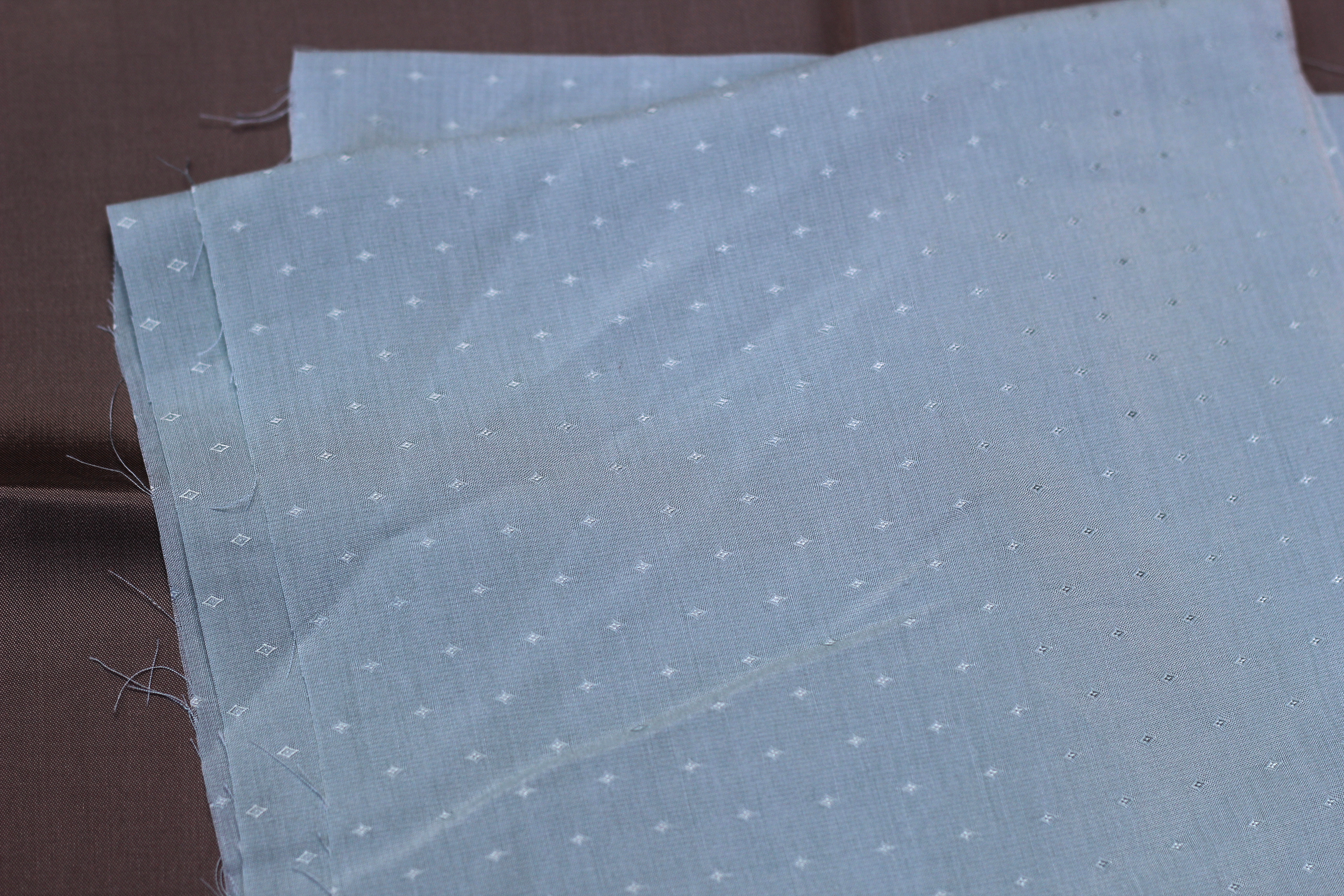
- Material type: Woven fabric

Dobby, or dobbie, is a woven fabric produced on the dobby loom, characterised by small geometric patterns and extra texture in the cloth. The warp and weft threads may be the same colour or different. Satin threads are particularly effective in this kind of weave as their texture will highlight the pattern.

Dobby usually features a simple, repeated geometric pattern.

Polo shirts are usually made with dobby. Piqué fabrics are a type of dobby construction.
