= Tristan Quilt =

14th century quilt

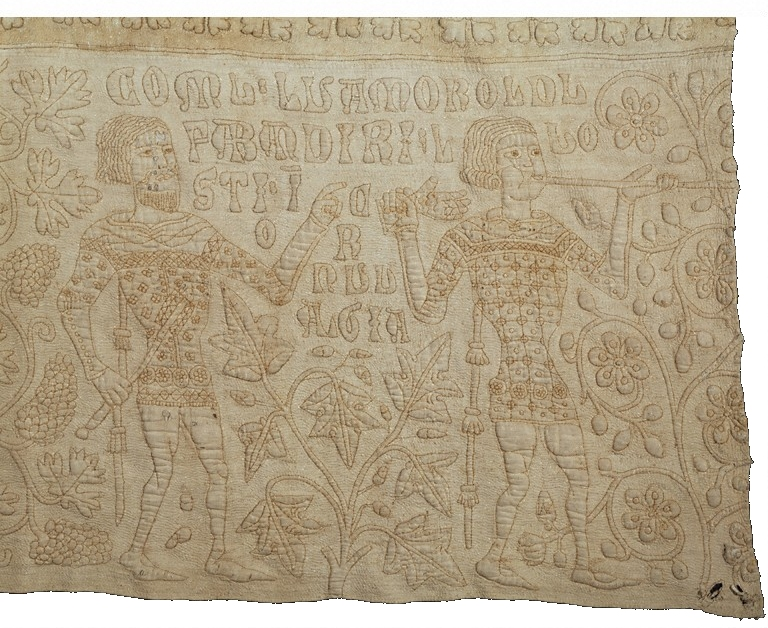
Detail of the Tristan quilt showing a noble and a herald.

The Tristan Quilt, sometimes called the Tristan and Isolde Quilt or the Guicciardini Quilt, is one of the earliest surviving quilts in the world. Depicting scenes from the story of Tristan and Isolde, an influential romance and tragedy, it was made in Sicily during the second half of the 14th century. There are at least two extant sections of the quilt, one of which is displayed in the Victoria and Albert Museum's Medieval and Renaissance Galleries, and the other in the Bargello in Florence. A third quilt, also depicting Tristan and Isolde, but not thought to be part of the V&A and Bargello examples, is held in private hands. The Tristan Quilts are the only known surviving intact examples of medieval quilts.

== Material and construction ==
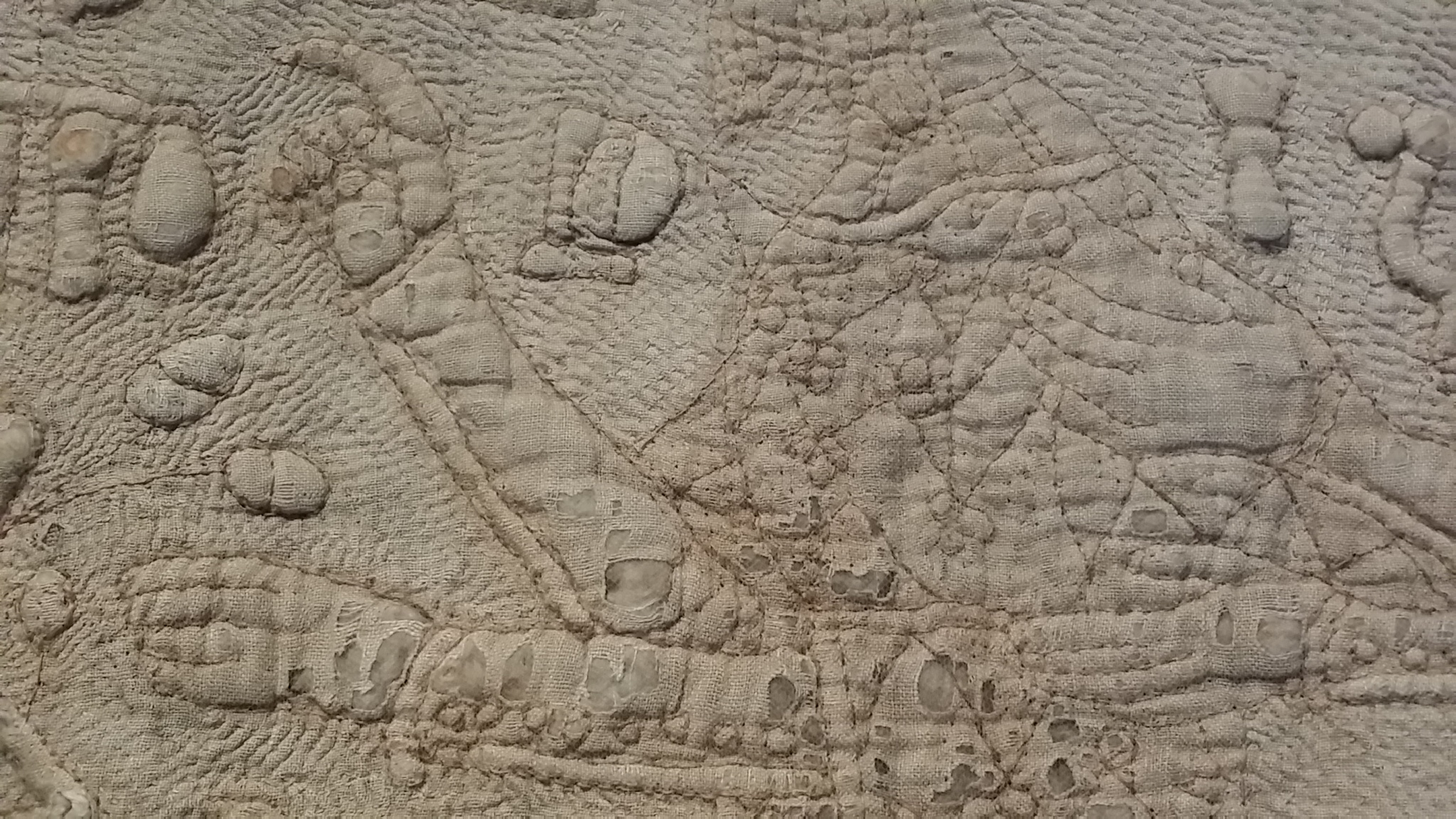
Detail of a knight's hands and arms. Surface wear has exposed the wadding beneath.

The quilt is made from two layers of linen, stitched together with cotton wadding in between. Backstitch in cream and brown linen thread defines a series of pictures with captions that have been brought into relief by inserting rolls of cotton stuffing to raise sections of the design, a technique known as trapunto. The stuffing could have been introduced during the quilting process, or because the backing layer is looser in weave, its threads could have been parted to introduce the stuffing; some elements are done using cord quilting.

== Subjects ==
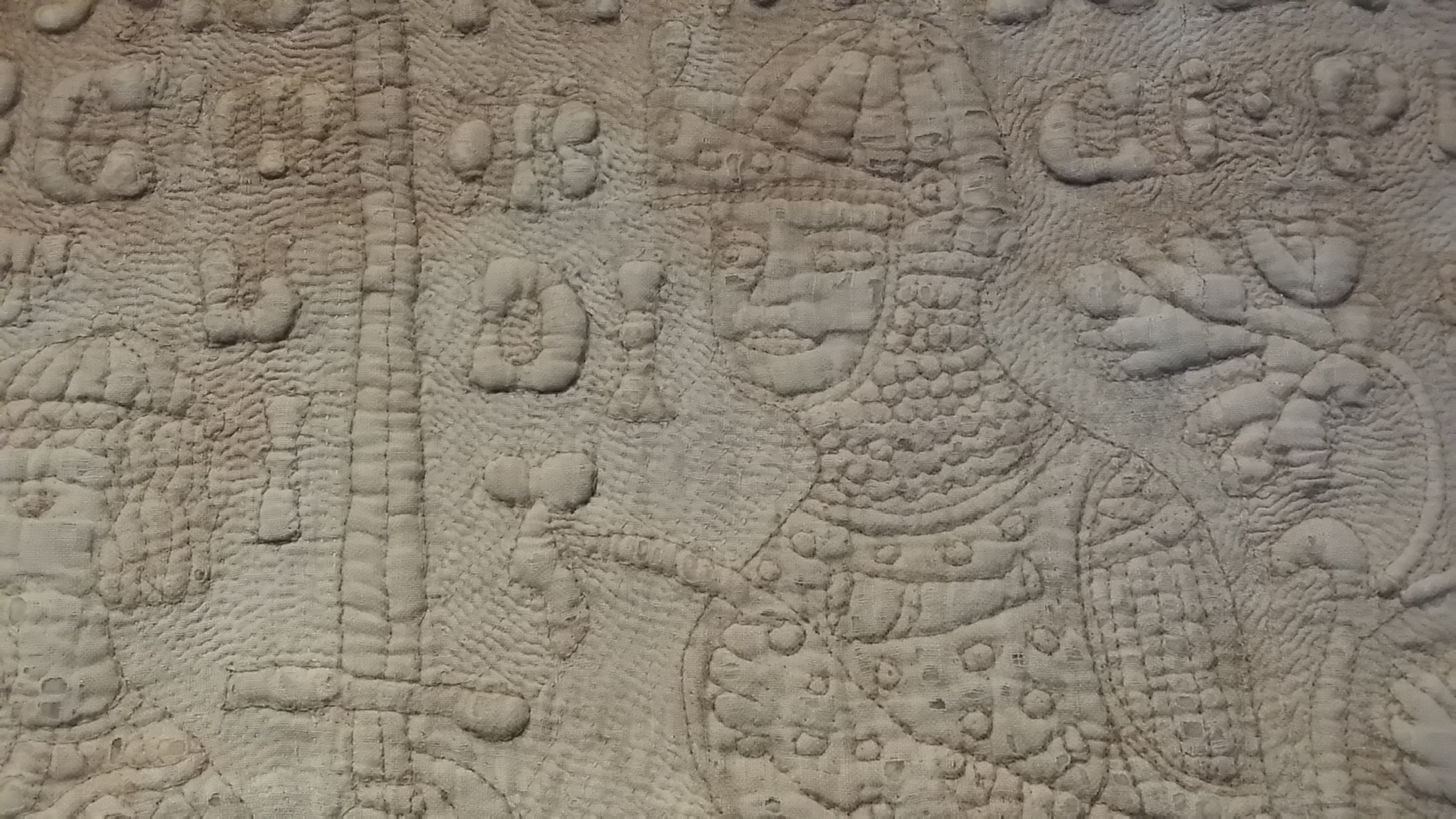
Detail of Tristan from scene 7

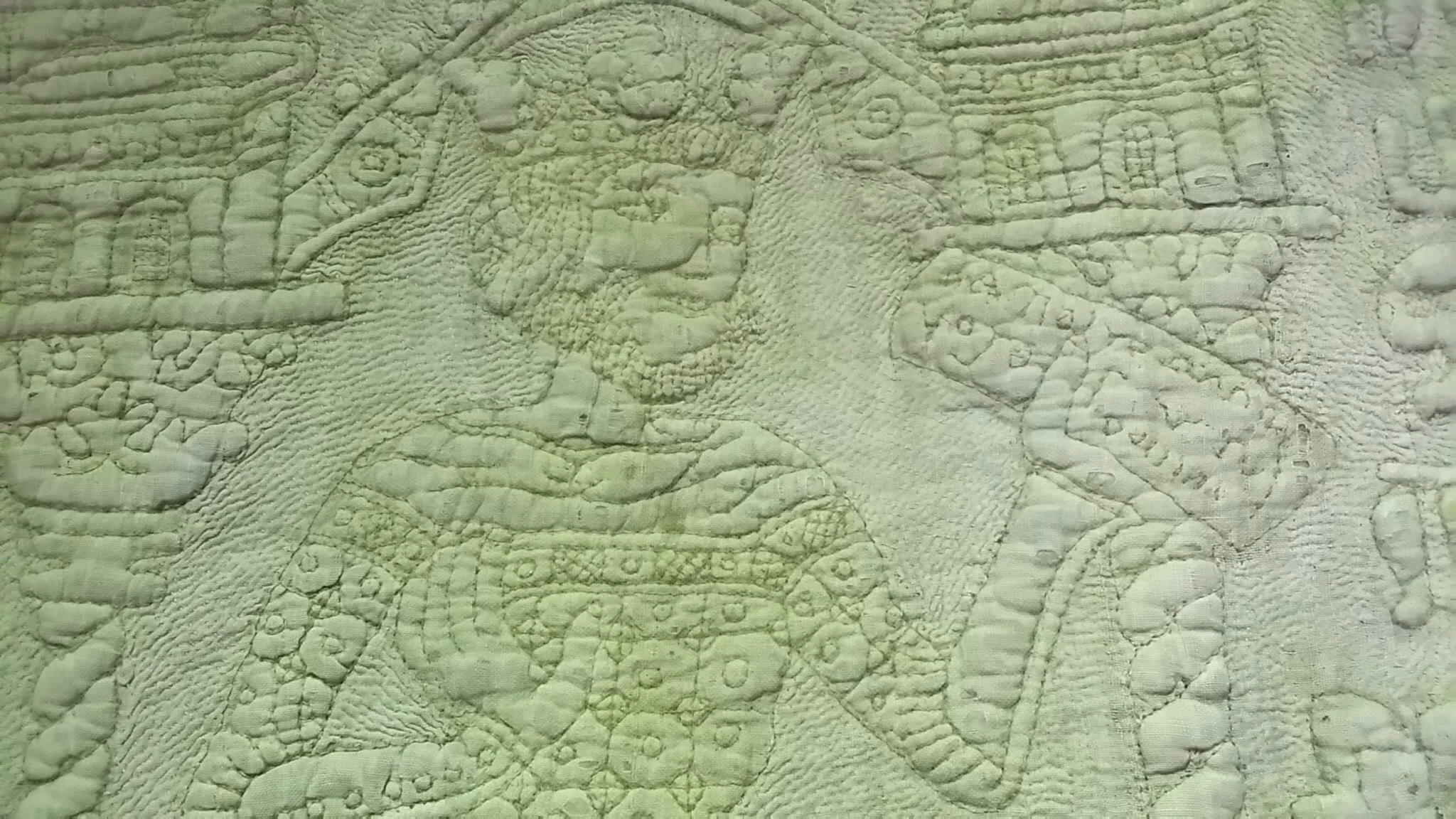
Detail of King Mark from scene 7

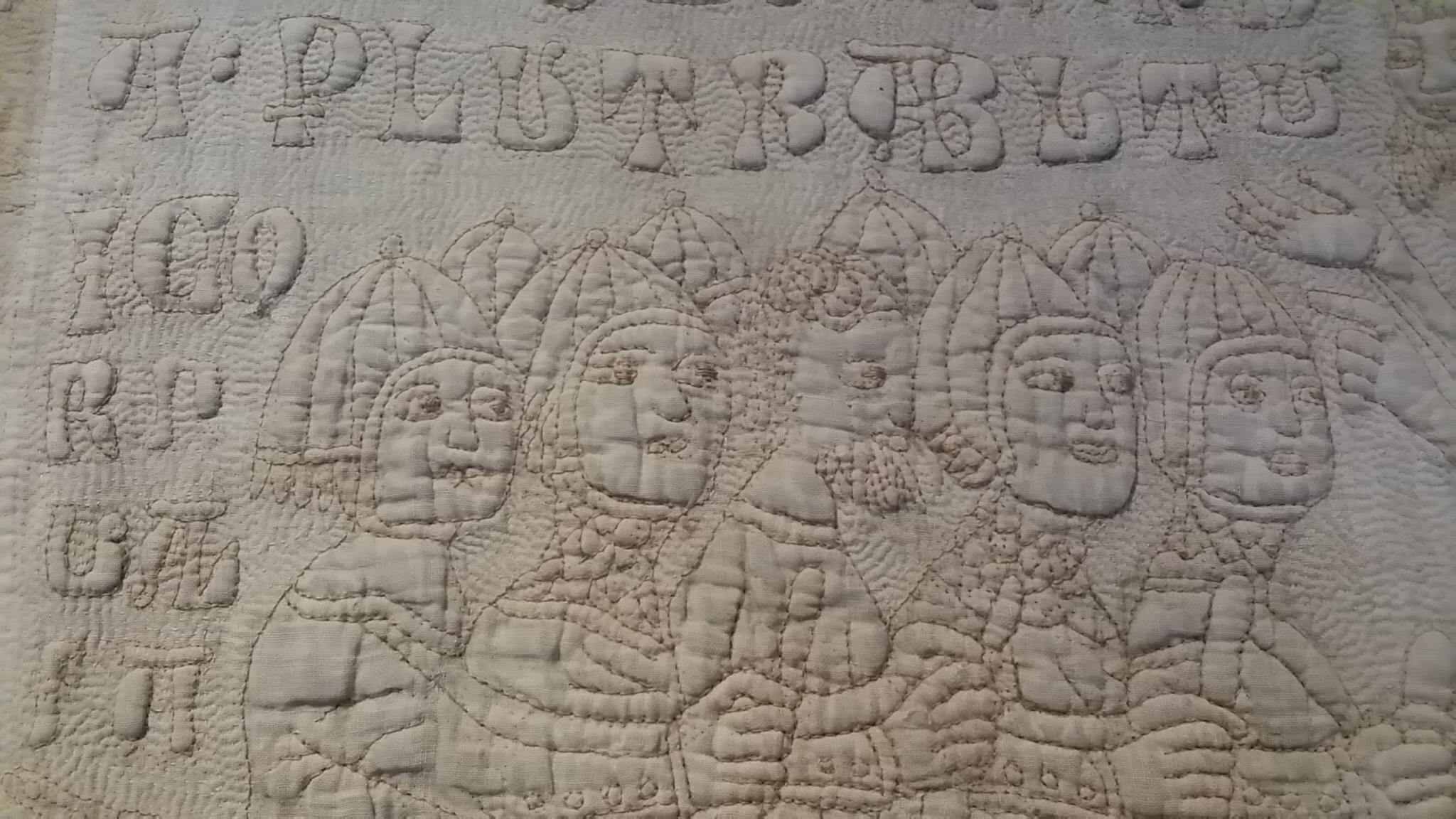
Detail of rowers from scene 8

The imagery on the quilt resembles the narrative of chapters 17–19 of a 14th-century novella, La Tavola Rotonda o L'Istoria di Tristano, which describes the oppression of Cornwall by Languis of Ireland and his champion Amoroldo (a variation on "Morholt"), and the battle of Tristan on behalf of King Mark of Cornwall. The foliage on the quilt includes ivy and grape vines, a reference to the plants that grew and intertwined from the tombs of the doomed Tristan and Isolde. The scenes on the V&A quilt are not in their original order, having been re-arranged at some point. Each scene has a caption in the Sicilian language.

There are six scenes in the central section of the V&A quilt, with a border of four-leaf clovers:

1: Morholt, bearing a fleur-de-lis shield, is shown shooting with a bow whilst on horseback in a boat. A page rows the boat. Caption: COMU LU AMORODU FERIU: TRISTAINU A TRaDIMANTU ("How the Morholt wounded Tristan")
2: A castle with a king and queen and a third person looking out, possibly Languis and Lotta and their daughter Isolde waiting for Morholt. Partial caption: ...SITA: IN AIRLANDIA ("...in Ireland")
3: Tristan, with a three-horned shield, fights Morholt on an island. Caption: COMU: TRISTAINU FERIU LU AMOROLLDU In TESTA ("How Tristan wounded Morholt in the head")
4: A page with a saddled horse. Caption: COMU:LU InNA (?) DELU AMOROLDU: ASPECTTAUA LU PATRUNU ("How the Morholt's page waited for his master")
5: A ship being pushed away by Tristan's foot. Caption: COMU TRISTAINU BUCTA: LA VARCA: ARRETU: INTU ALLU MARU ("How Tristan struck his boat behind him into the sea")
6: Tristan with his horse and shield. Caption: COMU: TRISTAINU: ASPECTA: LU AMOROLDU: ALLA ISOLA DI LU MARU: SANSA UINTURA ("How Tristan awaits Morholt on the isle Sanza Ventura in the sea")

There are also eight scenes in the border. Along the lower edge are two scenes:

7: Mark of Cornwall receives a letter from two kneeling ambassadors while Tristan stands behind them. Caption:COMU (li m) ISSAGIERI: SO UINNTI: AL (lu) RRE: MARGU: Per LU TRIBUTU DI SECTI ANNI ("How the ambassadors are come to King Mark for the tribute of seven years")
8: The ambassadors, in a ship rowed by soldiers and bearing a fleur-de-lis banner. Caption: COMU: LU RRE: LANGUIs: MANDA: Per LU TRABUTU In CORNUALIA ("How Languis sent to Cornwall for the tribute")

On the left side, from the top:

9: A ship, bearing fleur-de-lis banners with a man blowing a boatswain's call in the poop deck. Caption: COMU: LU AMOROLDU: EUINUTU: IN CORNUALGIA: CUm XXXX GALS ("How Morholt came to Cornwall with forty galleys")
10: Tristan giving his glove to Morholt. Caption: COMU: Tristainu DAI: LU GUAnTU ALLU AMOROLDU DELA BACTAGLIA ("How Tristan gives the glove of battle to Morholt")
11: A Cornish noble paying money to seven of Morholt's men. Caption: COMU: LU AMOROLDU: SULDARI: LA GENTI ("How Morholt made the people pay")

On the right side, from the top:

12: A ship bearing a fleur-de-lis banner with Morholt in the poop deck with a man blowing a boatswain's call. Caption: COMU: LU AMOROLDU VAI: In CORNUALGIA ("How Morholt comes to Cornwall")
13: King Languis, with three nobles behind him, gives a letter to two kneeling ambassadors, while Morholt stands behind them. Caption: COMU: LURRE: LANGUIS: CUMANDA: CHI VAIA: LO OSTI: CORNUAGLIA ("How King Languis ordered that the host should go to Cornwall")
14: Morholt, with a mace, with a herald blowing a trumpet. Caption: COMO: LU AMOROLDU FAB ANDIRI: LU OSTI: In CORNUALGIA ("How Morholt made the host go to Cornwall")

The Bargello quilt has eight scenes and is made from three longitudinal strips joined. Some of the scenes on the Bargello quilt portray Tristan leaving his foster-father's court to go to Mark of Cornwall; the meeting of Tristan with Morholt for combat; and their fight on horseback.

A third quilt in a private collection, thought to be from the same atelier but not actually part of these two quilts, includes a central medallion showing Tristan and Isolde on a field of fleur de lis.

== Dimensions ==
The V&A quilt measures 320 cm (10 ft 6 in) high by 287 cm (9 ft 5 in) wide. These measurements were verified in 2006 when it was prepared for display in the new Medieval and Renaissance Galleries.

The Bargello quilt measures 247 cm (8 ft 1 in) high by 207 cm (6 ft 9 in) wide.

== Purpose ==
Recent research has suggested that the quilts were made as a pair of wall hangings, and subsequently altered. Some sources state that there was a third quilt, believed to have been made for the royal Capetian House of Anjou. This third fragment, known as the Pianetti or Azzolini quilt, is in private hands and is thought to come from the same source as the V&A and Bargello quilts.

The textile historian Sarah Randles argues that the two quilts were originally one large quilt, measuring a monumental 6 metres high by 4 metres wide, and that significant sections are missing. Randles' plan for the quilt suggests that the scenes would have been arranged clockwise in the border, with the central images paired and reading bottom to top. Ultraviolet light tests on the Bargello quilt revealed traces of calcium on the reverse, which could have come from its use as a wall hanging, though such use may not have been the original intention.

== History ==
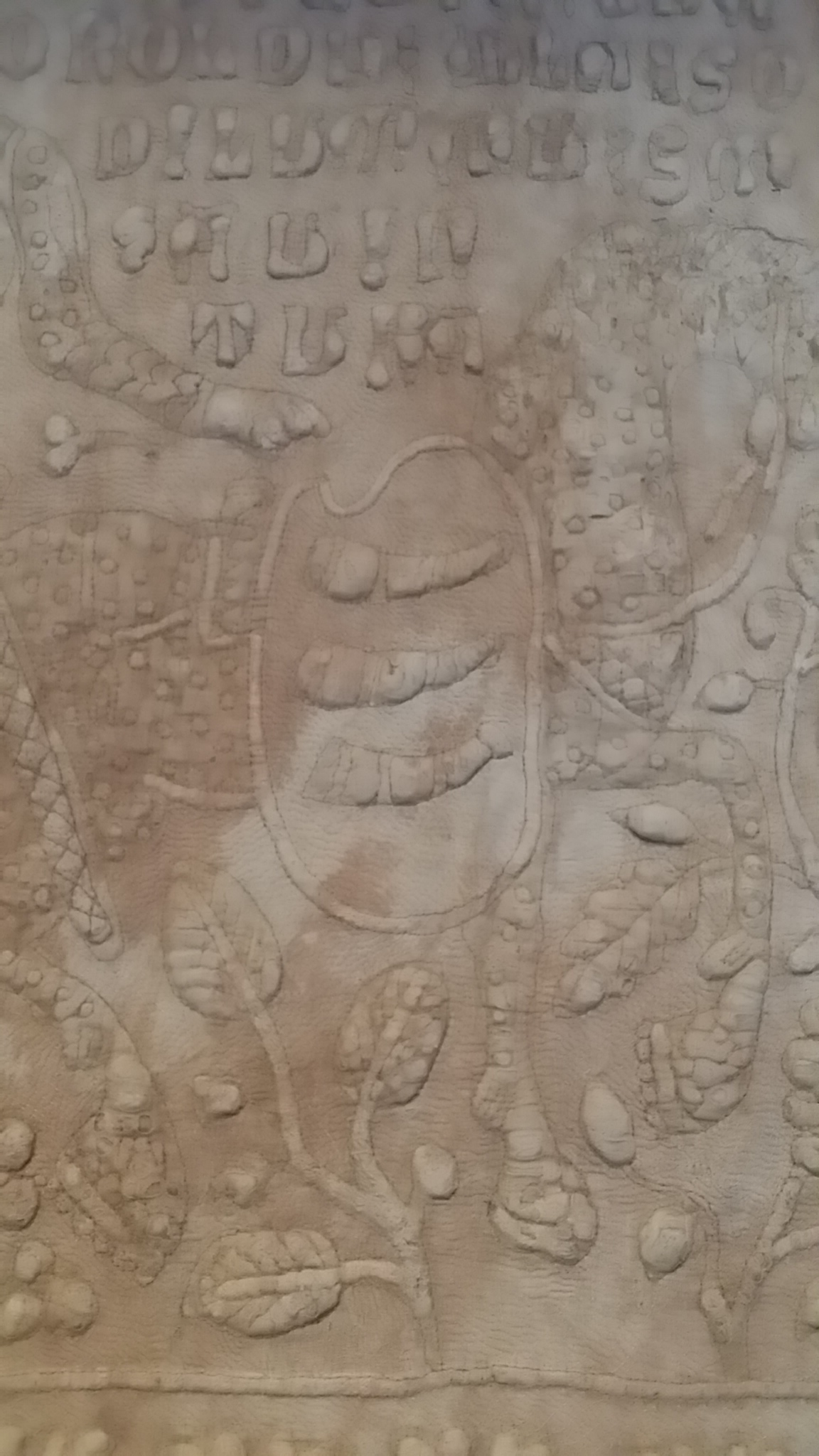
Tristan's shield with three hunting horns.

It was long believed that the quilts were made to be given as a wedding gift to Pietro di Luigi Guicciardini and Laodomia Acciaiuli in 1395. Later research suggests an earlier date. The three hunting horns on Tristan's shield are the coat of arms of the Guicciardini family. The inventories of the Guicciardini family do not include a definitive reference to the quilts, but do mention "three quilted bedcovers".

The V&A quilt, according to its museum number (1391–1904), was acquired in 1904.

The Bargello acquired their quilt in July 1927 from Count Paolo Guicciardini, to whose family it is believed the quilt had always belonged.
