= Trapunto quilting =

Italian stuffed quilting technique

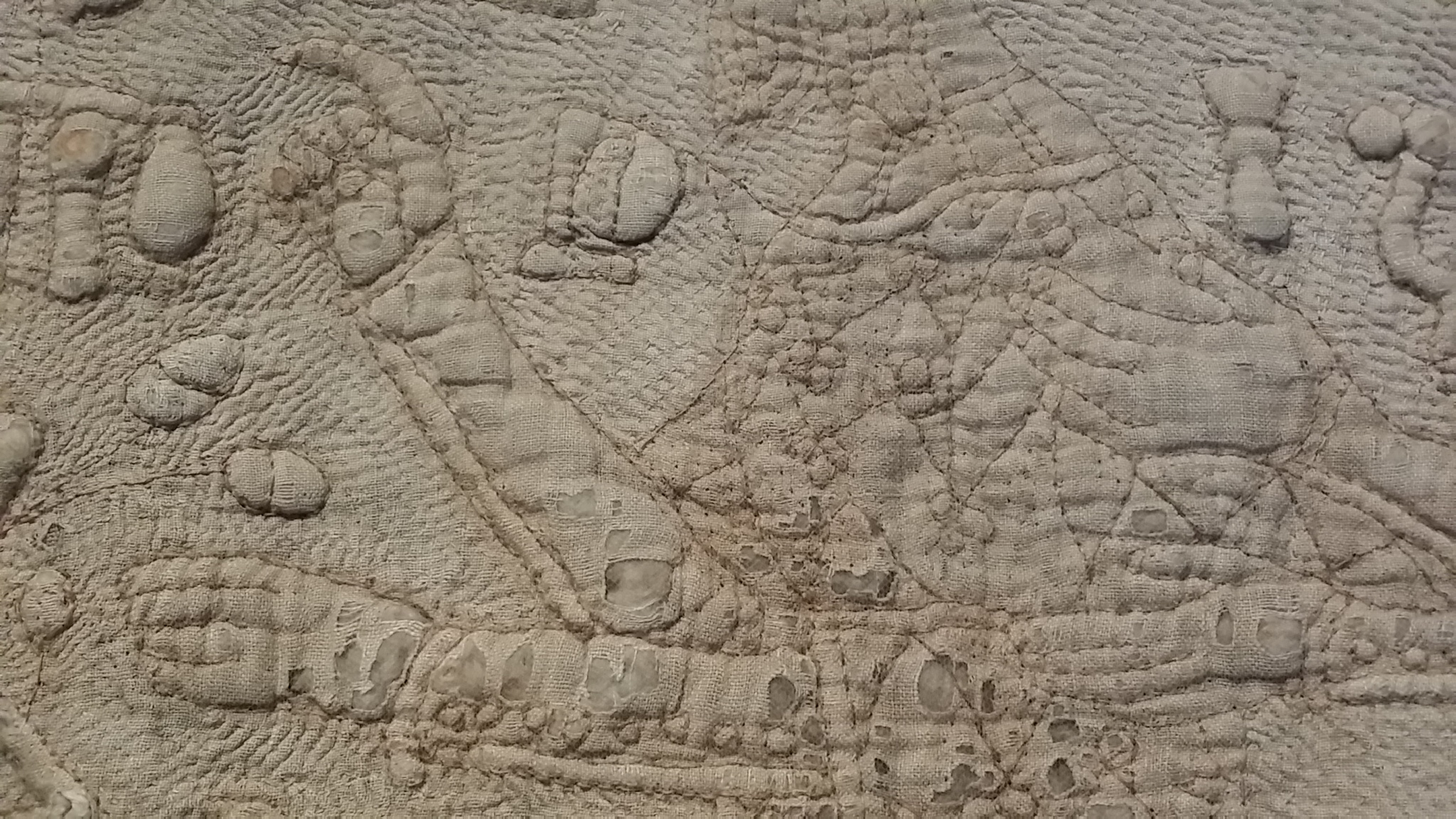
Detail of the late 14th century linen Tristan Quilt. Surface wear has exposed the wadding beneath.

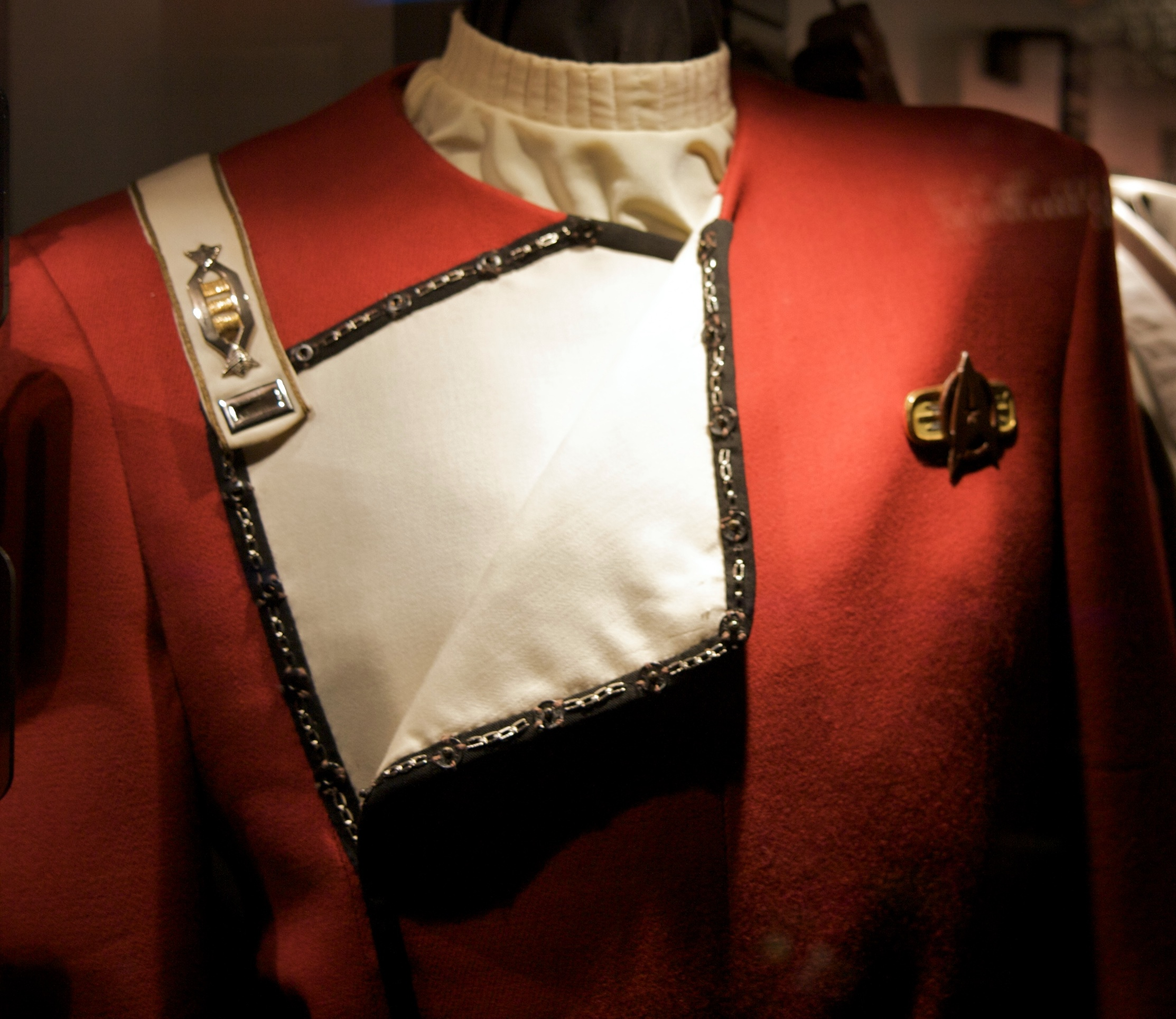
The collar on this uniform from Star Trek II: The Wrath of Khan employs the trapunto method.

Trapunto, from the Italian for "to quilt", is a method of quilting that is also called "stuffed technique". A puffy, decorative feature, trapunto utilizes at least two layers, the underside of which is slit and padded, producing a raised surface on the quilt.

== History ==
The style originated in Italy before the 14th century.

== Technique ==
Trapunto is often confused with the relatively similar techniques used in making traditional whole cloth Provençal quilts that were developed from the 17th century onwards in France.

== Earliest ==
One of the earliest surviving examples of trapunto quilting is the Tristan Quilt in the Victoria and Albert Museum, a linen quilt representing scenes from the story of Tristan and Isolde which was made in Sicily during the second half of the 13th century. Another piece of the Tristan Quilt, thought to be from a pair to the V. & A.'s example, is in Palazzo Davanzati in Florence.

== Modern ==
The technique was notably used to create the inner-tunic collars worn with Starfleet uniforms in Star Trek II: The Wrath of Khan and several other Star Trek films. As functional trapunto machines were rare, and the specialized needles which they employed were even rarer, the production team was able to find only a single usable needle. The fear of losing or damaging it was so great that a crew member was specifically designated to take the needle home with them at the end of every day.
