= Double cloth =

Woven textile type

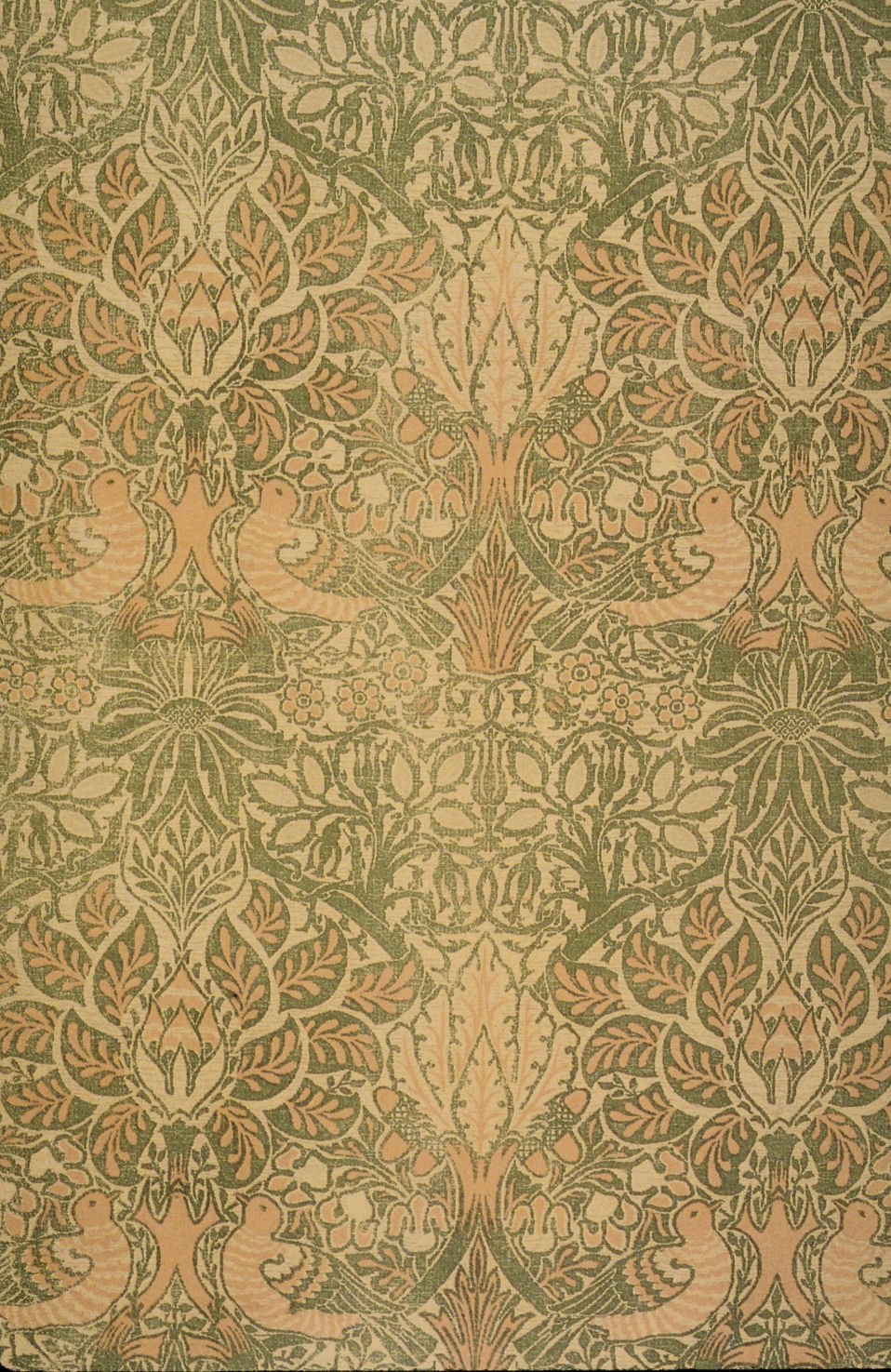
Dove and Rose jacquard-woven silk and wool double cloth furnishing textile, designed by William Morris in 1879.

Double cloth or double weave (also doublecloth, double-cloth, doubleweave) is a kind of woven textile in which two or more sets of warps and one or more sets of weft or filling yarns are interconnected to form a two-layered cloth. The movement of threads between the layers allows complex patterns and surface textures to be created.

In contemporary textile manufacturing, the term "double cloth" or "true double cloth" is sometimes restricted to fabrics with two warps and three wefts, made up as two distinct fabrics lightly connected by the third or binding weft, but this distinction is not always made, and double-woven fabrics in which two warps and two wefts interlace to form geometric patterns are also called double cloths.

== Compound fabrics ==
Compound fabrics or double-faced fabrics are a form of double cloth made of one warp and two sets of wefts, or (less often) two warps and one weft. These fabrics have two right sides or faces and no wrong side, and include most blankets, satin ribbons, and interlinings.

Double weaving is an ancient technique. Surviving examples from the Paracas culture of Peru have been dated to before AD 700.

Modern applications of double cloth include haute couture coats, blankets, furnishing fabrics, and some brocades.

== Characteristics ==
Double weave constructions are generally thick, heavy, reversible and warm. Examples are Albert cloth and Biretz.

== Uses ==
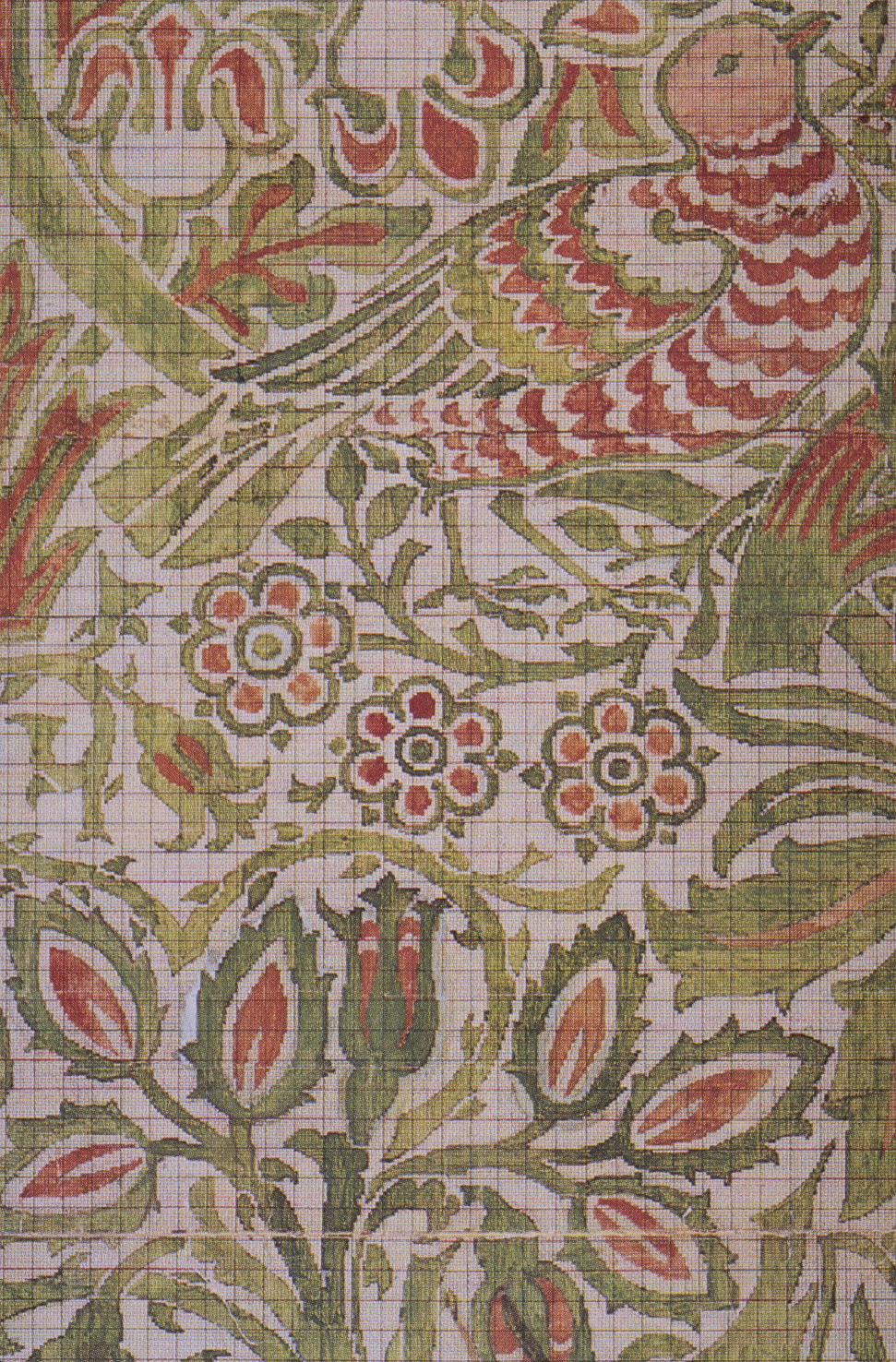
"Point-paper" or weaving design for Dove and Rose.

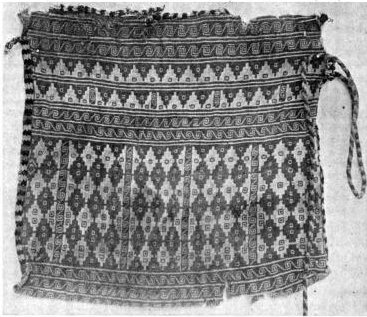
Double cloth bag from Peru.

Double cloth textiles are a characteristic artifact of Pre-Columbian Peru, where they are woven of cotton and alpaca yarns in various combinations.

In Medieval England, double weaves called compound weft-faced twills featured weft or filling yarns in multiple colors, with the design completely covering the face warp yarns and the unused colors for any particular section woven into a binding warp on the reverse side.

In the early 19th century America, double cloth wool and cotton woven coverlets were made by professional weavers from wool that was spun (and often dyed) at home and then delivered to a local weaver who made up the coverlet.

In the later 19th century, craftsmen and designer William Morris offered wool and silk double cloth fabrics for furnishing through his firm Morris, Marshall, Faulkner & Co. (later Morris & Co.). These double-woven fabrics had separate warps of wool and silk yarn and were woven by Alexander Morton & Co. of Darvel, Scotland, who would later weave similar fabrics from designs by C.F.A. Voysey and others.

Contemporary couture designers use "true" double cloth to make self-lined or reversible coats and jackets by using hand-finishing techniques such as separating the two layers at the hem and turning the raw edges under. Double cloth garments may also be made reversible by binding or overcasting edges.
