= Jacquard machine =

Control device attached to weaving looms

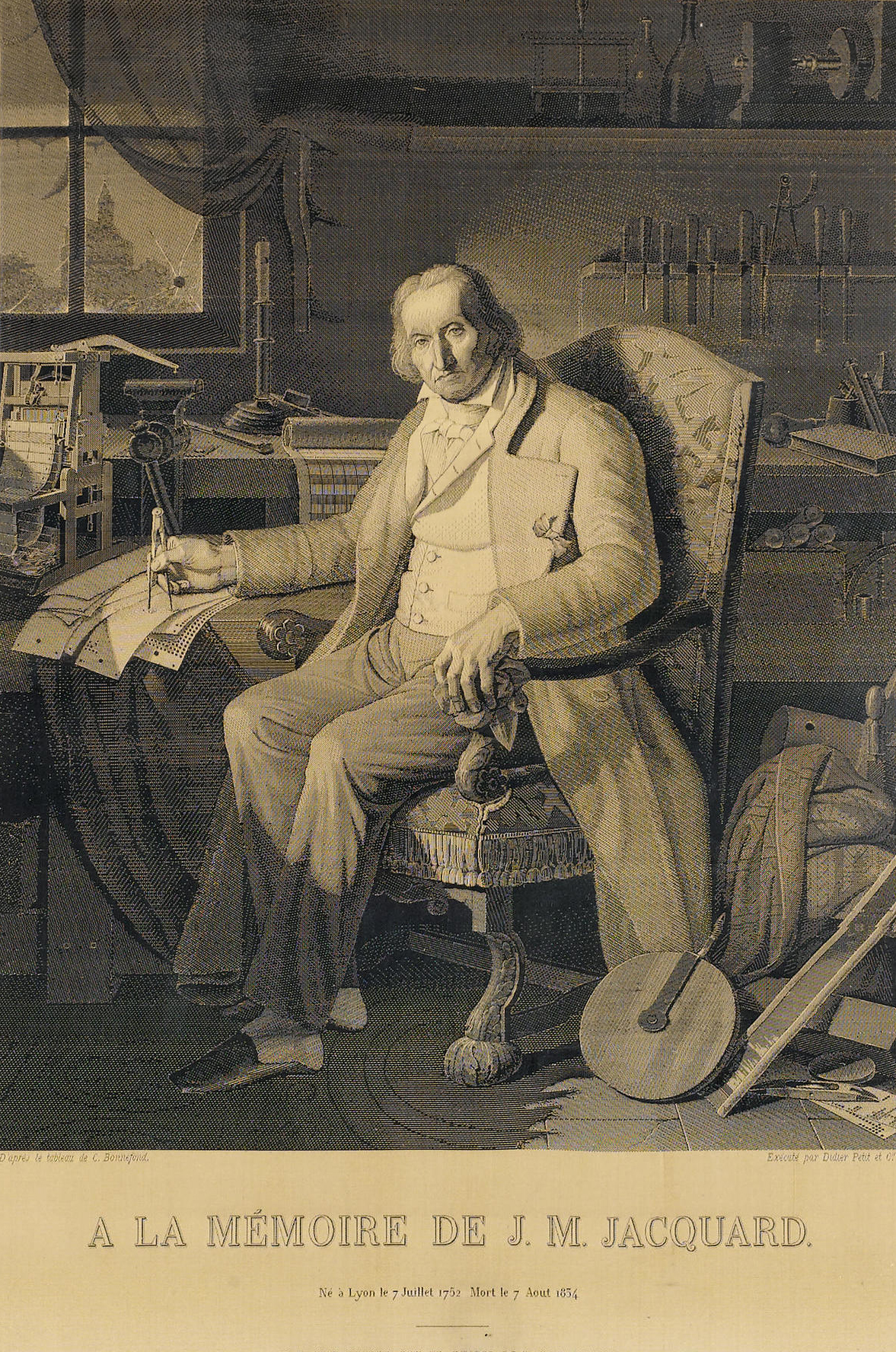
This portrait of Jacquard was woven in silk on a Jacquard loom and required 24,000 punched cards to create (1839). It was only produced to order. Charles Babbage owned one of these portraits; it inspired him in using perforated cards in his Analytical Engine. It is in the collection of the Science Museum in London, England.

The Jacquard machine (French: [ʒakaʁ]) is a device fitted to a loom that simplifies the process of manufacturing textiles with such complex patterns as brocade, damask and matelassé. The resulting ensemble of the loom and Jacquard machine is then called a Jacquard loom. The machine was patented by Joseph Marie Jacquard in 1804, based on earlier inventions by the Frenchmen Basile Bouchon (1725), Jean Baptiste Falcon (1728), and Jacques Vaucanson (1740). The machine was controlled by a "chain of cards"; a number of punched cards laced together into a continuous sequence. Multiple rows of holes were punched on each card, with one complete card corresponding to one row of the design.

Both the Jacquard process and the necessary loom attachment are named after their inventor. This mechanism is probably one of the most important weaving innovations, as Jacquard shedding made possible the automatic production of unlimited varieties of complex pattern weaving. The term "Jacquard" is not specific or limited to any particular loom, but rather refers to the added control mechanism that automates the patterning. The process can also be used for patterned knitwear and machine-knitted textiles such as jerseys.

This use of replaceable punched cards to control a sequence of operations is considered an important step in the history of computing hardware, having inspired Charles Babbage's Analytical Engine.

== History ==
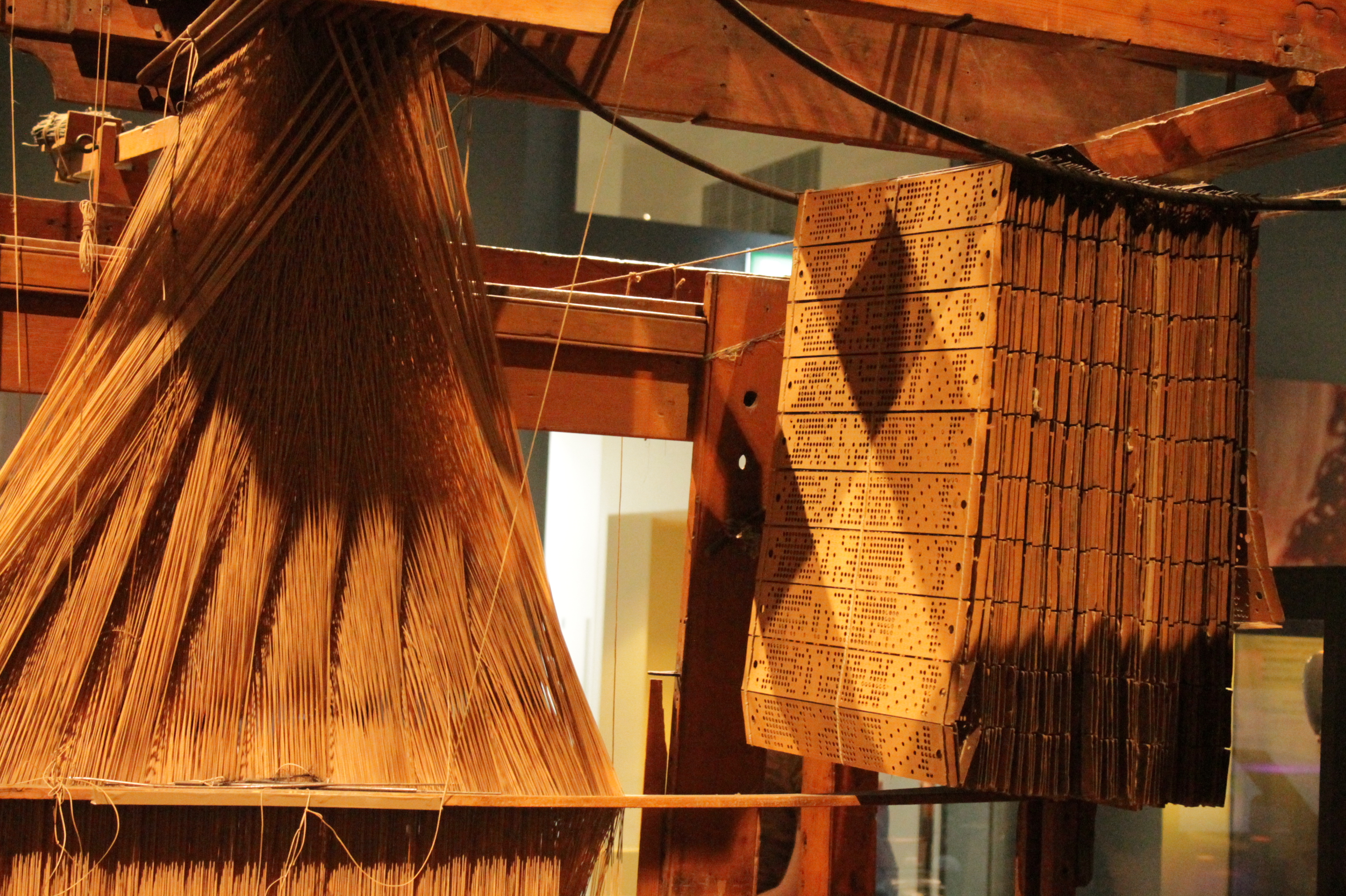
A Jacquard loom showing information punchcards, National Museum of Scotland

Traditionally, figured designs were made on a drawloom. The heddles with warp ends to be pulled up were manually selected by a second operator, the draw boy, not the weaver. The work was slow and labour-intensive, and the complexity of the pattern was limited by practical factors.

The first prototype of a Jacquard-type loom was made in the second half of the 15th century by an Italian weaver from Calabria, known as "Jean le Calabrais", who was invited to Lyon by Louis XI. He introduced a new kind of machine which was able to work the yarns faster and more precisely. Over the years, improvements to the loom were ongoing.

An improvement of the draw loom took place in 1725, when Basile Bouchon introduced the principle of applying a perforated band of paper. A continuous roll of paper was punched by hand, in sections, each of which represented one lash or tread, and the length of the roll was determined by the number of shots in each repeat of pattern. The Jacquard machine then evolved from this approach.

Joseph Marie Jacquard saw that a mechanism could be developed for the production of sophisticated patterns. He possibly combined mechanical elements of other inventors, but certainly innovated. His machine was generally similar to Vaucanson's arrangement, but he made use of Jean-Baptiste Falcon's individual pasteboard cards and his square prism (or card "cylinder"): he is credited with having fully perforated each of its four sides, replacing Vaucanson's perforated "barrel". Jacquard's machine contained eight rows of needles and uprights, where Vaucanson had a double row. This modification enabled him to increase the figuring capacity of the machine. In his first machine, he supported the harness by knotted cords, which he elevated by a single trap board.

One of the chief advantages claimed for the Jacquard machine was that unlike previous damask-weaving machines, in which the figuring shed was usually drawn once for every four shots, with the new apparatus, it could be drawn on every shot, thus producing a fabric with greater definition of outline.

Jacquard's invention had a deep influence on Charles Babbage. In that respect, he is viewed by some authors as a precursor of modern computing technology.

== Principles of operation ==
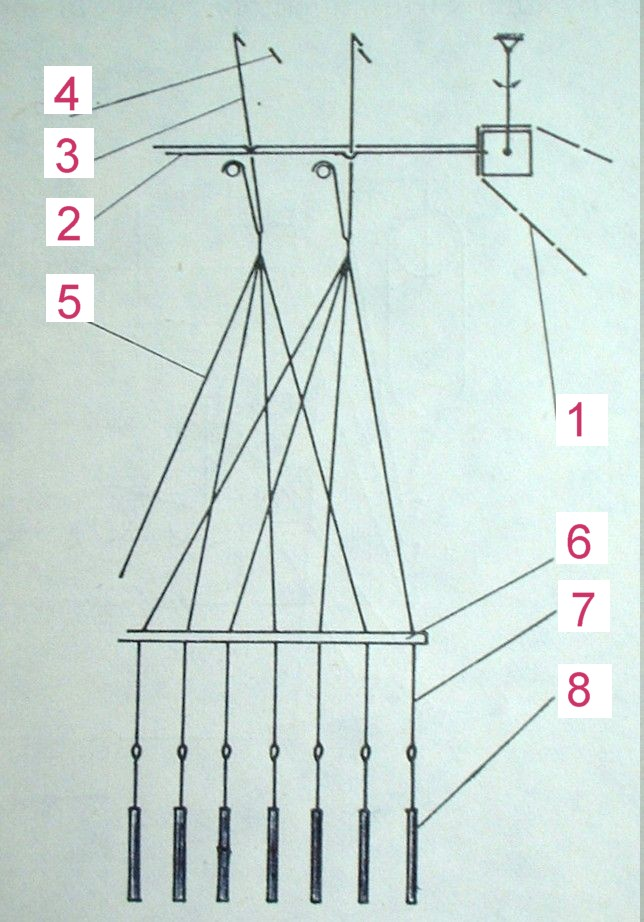
A schematic diagram of the Jacquard system: 1. Card chain; 2. Control rods; 3. Hook; 4. Warp beam; 5. Cords; 6. Guide; 7. Heddle; 8. Return weight

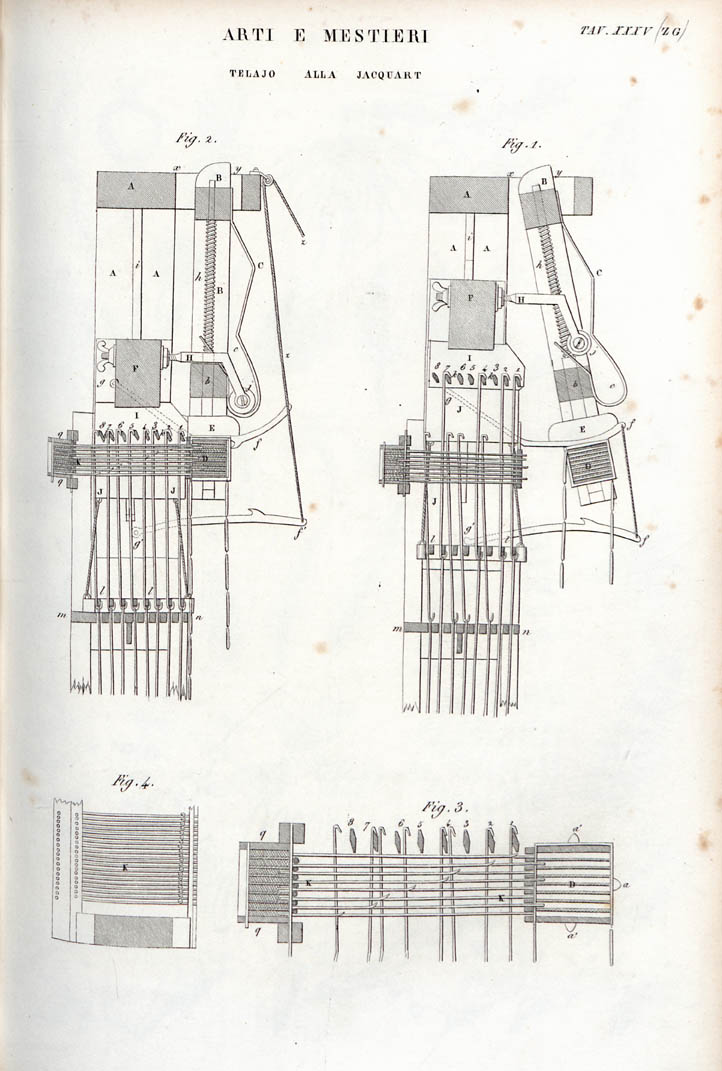
19th century Engineering drawing of a Jacquard loom

As shown in the diagram, the cards are fastened into a continuous chain (1) which passes over a square box. At each quarter rotation, a new card is presented to the Jacquard head which represents one row (one "pick" of the shuttle carrying the weft). The box swings from the right to the position shown and presses against the control rods (2). For each hole in the card, a rod passes through and is unmoved; where there is no hole, a rod is pushed to the left. Each rod acts upon a hook (3). When the rod is pushed in, the hook moves out of position to the left; a rod that is not pushed in leaves its hook in place. A beam (4) then rises under the hooks, and the hooks in the rest position are raised. The hooks that have been displaced are not moved by the beam. Each hook can have multiple cords (5). Each cord passes through a guide (6) and is attached to a corresponding heddle (7) and return weight (8). The heddles raise the warp to create the shed through which the shuttle carrying the weft will pass. A loom with a 400-hook head might have four threads connected to each hook, resulting in a fabric that is 1600 warp ends wide with four repeats of the weave going across.

The term "Jacquard loom" is somewhat inaccurate. It is the "Jacquard head" that adapts to a great many dobby looms that allow the weaving machine to then create the intricate patterns often seen in Jacquard weaving.

Jacquard-driven looms, although relatively common in the textile industry, are not as ubiquitous as dobby looms which are usually faster and much cheaper to operate. However, dobby looms are not capable of producing many different weaves from one warp. Modern Jacquard machines are controlled by computers in place of the original punched cards and can have thousands of hooks.

The threading of a Jacquard machine is so labour-intensive that many looms are threaded only once. Subsequent warps are then tied into the existing warp with the help of a knotting robot which ties on each new thread individually. Even for a small loom with only a few thousand warp ends, the process of re-threading can take days.

== Mechanical Jacquard devices ==
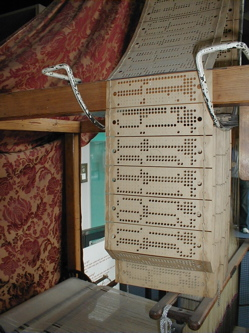
Punched cards in use in a Jacquard loom

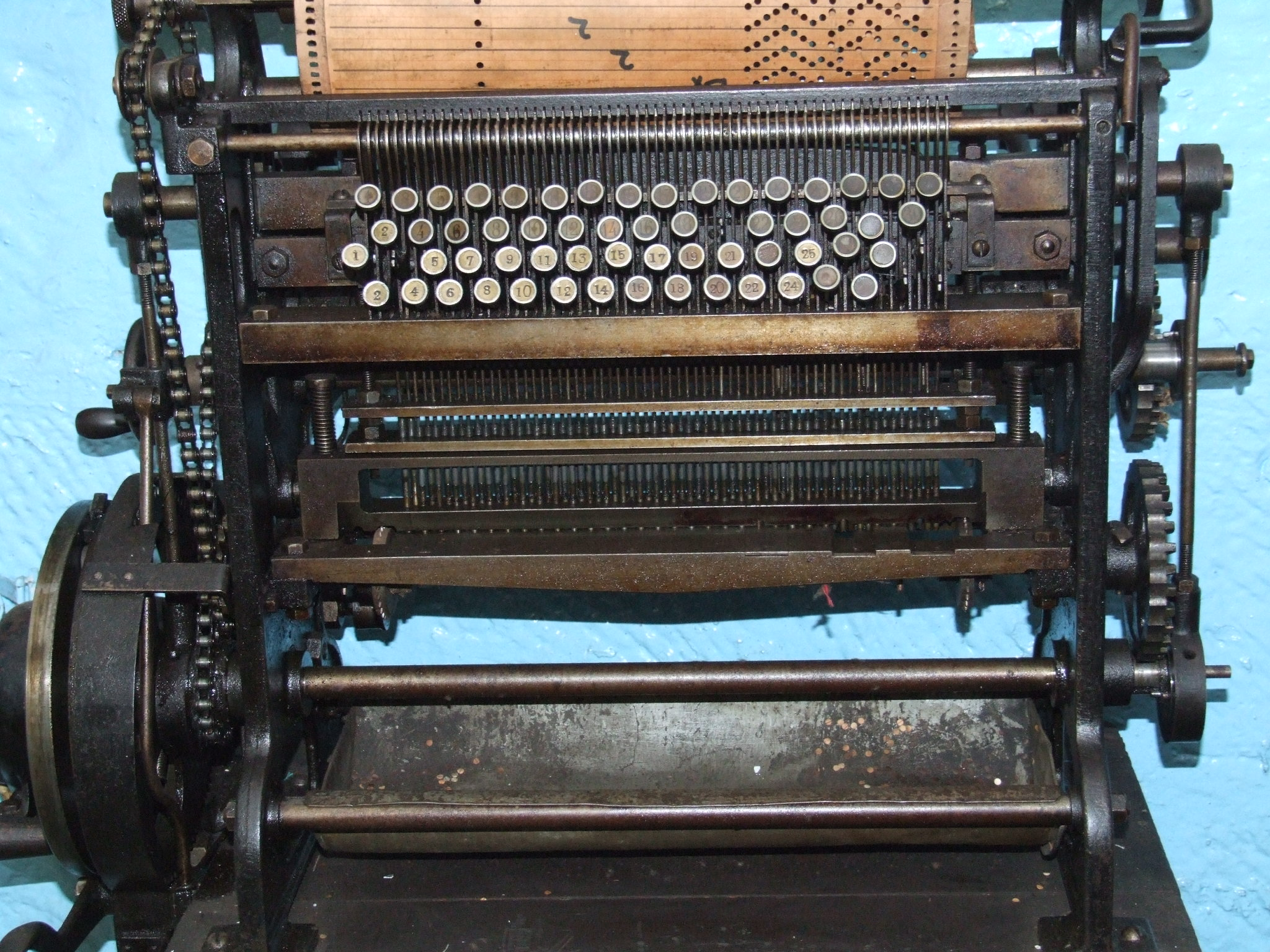
A punch for Jacquard cards

Originally, Jacquard machines were mechanical, and the fabric design was stored on a series of punched cards which were joined to form a continuous chain. The Jacquards were often small and controlled relatively few warp ends. This required a number of repeats across the loom width. Larger capacity machines, or the use of multiple machines, allowed greater control with fewer repeats; hence, larger designs could be woven across the loom width.

A factory must choose looms and shedding mechanisms to suit its commercial requirements. As a rule, greater warp control means greater expense. So it is not economical to purchase Jacquard machines if one can make do with a dobby mechanism. Beyond the capital expense, Jacquard machines cost more to maintain as they are complex, require highly-skilled operators, and use expensive systems to prepare designs for the loom. Thus, they are more likely to produce faults than dobby or cam shedding. Also, the looms will not run as quickly and down-time will increase because it takes time to change the continuous chain of cards when a design changes. It is best to weave larger batches with mechanical Jacquards.

== Electronic Jacquard machines ==
In 1855, a Frenchman adapted the Jacquard mechanism to a system by which it could be worked by electro-magnets. There was significant interest, but trials were not successful, and the development was soon forgotten.

Bonas Textile Machinery NV launched the first successful electronic Jacquard at ITMA Milan in 1983. (Note: According to its operators (CEMATEX, Le Comité Européen des Constructeurs de Machines Textiles, an organisation comprising 9 national European textile machinery associations) ITMA is "the world's largest international textile and garment technology exhibition".) Although the machines were initially small, modern technology has allowed Jacquard machine capacity to increase significantly, and single end warp control can extend to more than 10,000 warp ends. This eliminates the need for repeats and symmetrical designs and invites almost infinite versatility. The computer-controlled machines significantly reduce the down time associated with changing punchcards, thereby allowing smaller batch sizes. However, electronic Jacquards are costly and may not be necessary in a factory weaving large batch sizes and smaller designs. Larger machines accommodating single-end warp control are very expensive and can only be justified when great versatility or very specialized designs are required. For example, they are an ideal tool to increase the ability and versatility of niche linen Jacquard weavers who remain active in Europe and the West, while most large batch commodity weaving has moved to low-cost production.

Linen products associated with Jacquard weaving are linen damask napery, Jacquard apparel fabrics and damask bed linen. Jacquard weaving uses all sorts of fibers and blends of fibers, and it is used in the production of fabrics for many end uses. Jacquard weaving can also be used to create fabrics that have a Matelassé or a brocade pattern.

== The woven silk prayer book ==
A pinnacle of production using a Jacquard machine is a prayer book, woven in silk, entitled Livre de Prières. Tissé d'après les enluminures des manuscrits du XIVe au XVIe siècle. All 58 pages of the prayer book were woven silk, made with a Jacquard machine using black and gray thread, at 160 threads per cm (400 threads per inch). The pages have elaborate borders with text and pictures of saints. According to book historian Michael Laird, an estimated 106,000 to 500,000 punchcards were necessary to encode the pages.

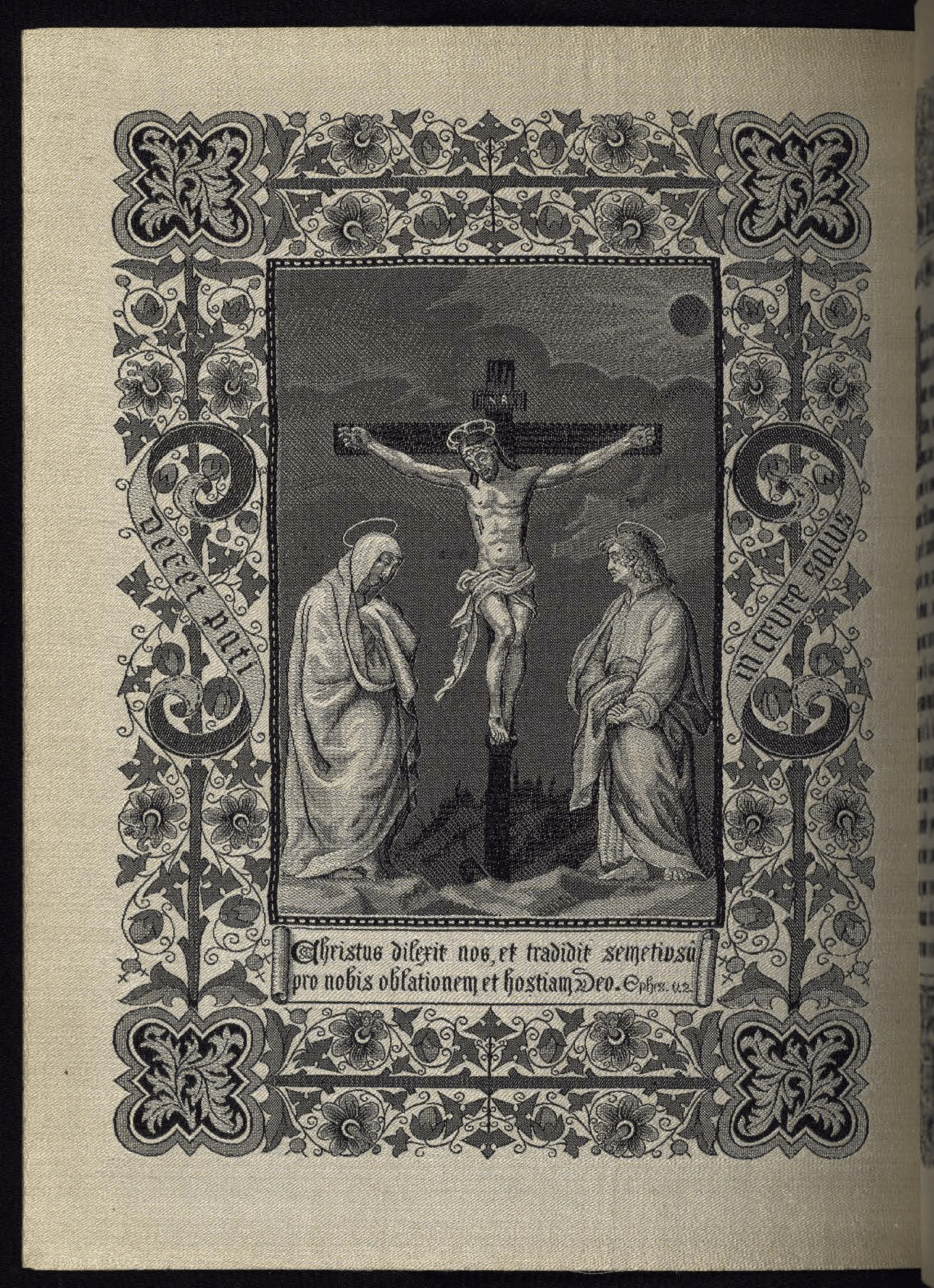
A page from the Livre de Prières.

The book was issued in 1886 and 1887 in Lyon, France, and was publicly displayed at the 1889 Exposition Universelle (World's Fair). It was designed by R. P. J. Hervier, woven by J. A. Henry, and published by A. Roux. It took two years and almost 50 trials to get correct. An estimated 50 or 60 copies were produced.

The manufacture of the volume employed the Jacquard method of using punch cards which J.A. Henry first used in Les laboureurs. Poème tiré de Jocelyn. Reproduit en caractères tissés avec license des propriétaires éditeurs (by Alphonse de Lamartine) in 1878. That earlier title is the true "first book 'printed' by computer".

== Importance in computing ==
The Jacquard head used replaceable punched cards to control a sequence of operations. It is considered an important step in the history of computing hardware. The ability to change the pattern of the loom's weave by simply changing cards was an important conceptual precursor to the development of computer programming and data entry. Charles Babbage knew of Jacquard machines and planned to use cards to store programs in his Analytical Engine. In the late 19th century, Herman Hollerith took the idea of using punched cards to store information a step further when he created a punched card tabulating machine which he used to input data for the 1890 United States census. A large data processing industry using punched-card technology was developed in the first half of the twentieth century—dominated initially by the International Business Machine corporation (IBM) with its line of unit record equipment. The cards were used for data, however, with programming done by plugboards.

Some early computers, such as the 1944 IBM Automatic Sequence Controlled Calculator (Harvard Mark I) received program instructions from a paper tape punched with holes, similar to Jacquard's string of cards. Later computers executed programs from higher-speed memory, though cards were commonly used to load the programs into memory. Punched cards remained in use in computing up until the mid-1980s.

== See also ==
- Thomas Ferguson & Co Ltd

== Sources ==
- Nelson, Hector William (1909). Jacquard machines; instruction paper. Chicago: American School of Correspondence.
- Posselt, Emanuel Anthony (1887). The Jacquard machine analyzed and explained: with an appendix on the preparation of Jacquard cards. Philadelphia: Pennsylvania museum and school of industrial art.
- Posselt, Emanuel Anthony (1893). The Jacquard Machine Analyzed & Explained. The preparation of Jacquard cards and practical hints to learners of Jacquard designing. Philadelphia: Philadelphia, Posselt.
- Razy, C. (1913). Étude analytique des petits modèles de métiers exposés au musée des tissus. Lyon, France: Musée historique des tissus.
