= John Pilling and Sons =

UK business

John Pilling and Sons Ltd
- Company type: Textile machinery& premises management
- Industry: Textile machinery
- Founded: 1819
- Defunct: 2005
- Headquarters: Trawden, later Colne, Lancashire, UK
- Products: Hand looms, Dandy looms, power looms (war work 1914-18, 1939-45)
- Services: after 1980 mill premises management

The family firm John Pilling and Sons Ltd, made hand, dandy and power looms from 1819. It started in Trawden making hand, dandy and then wooden framed wiper power looms and moved to Colne to make cast iron Lancashire Looms in 1849/50. They continued manufacturing until 1980. The firm also owned several weaving mills and remained in business until 2005 as a mill premises management company. During the wars it made huge quantities of shells, grenades, tank and aircraft parts.

== History ==
It started in Trawden making hand, dandy and then wooden framed wiper power looms and moved to Colne to make cast iron Lancashire Looms in 1849/50

== Premises ==
The firm also owned several weaving mills

== Gallery ==
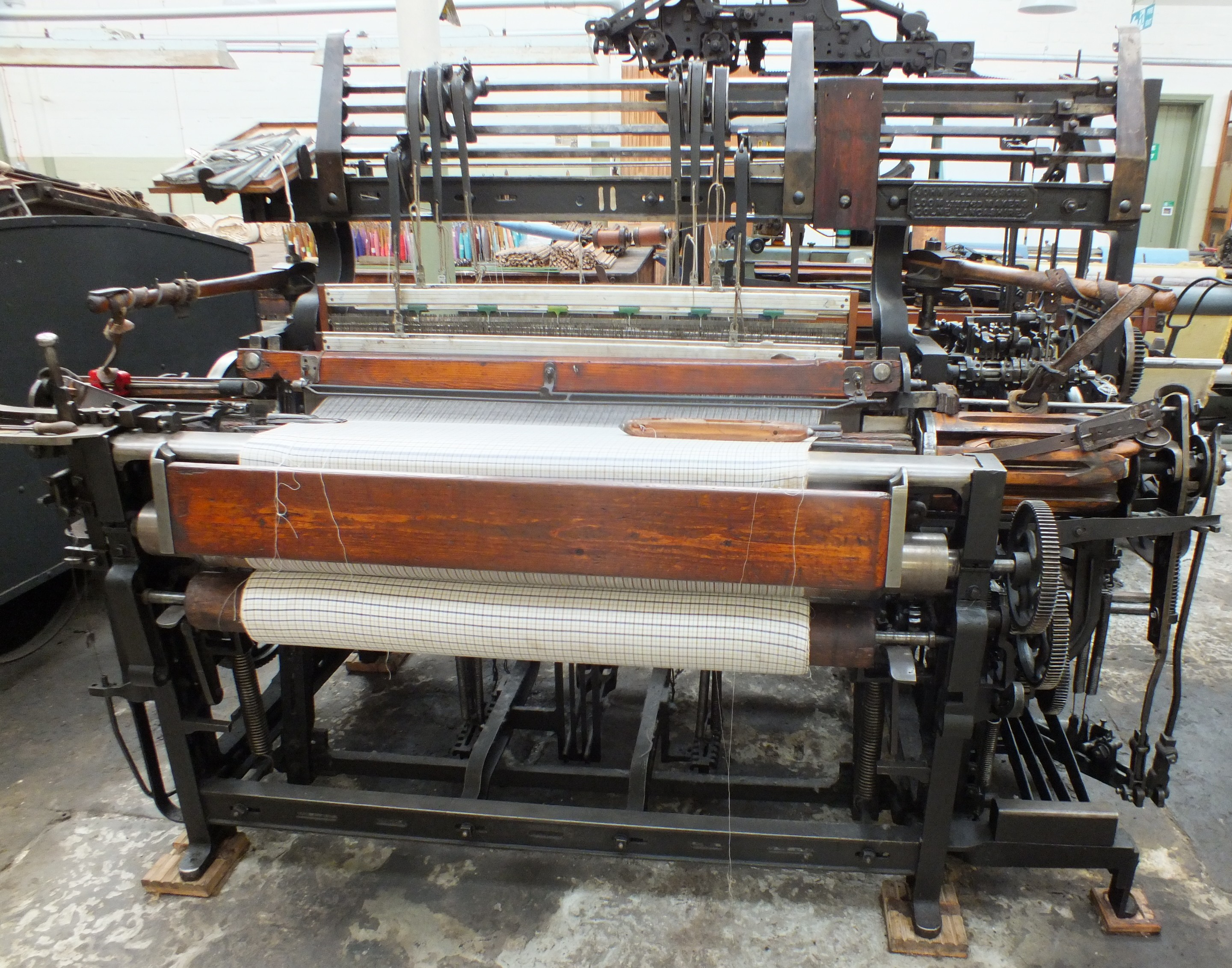

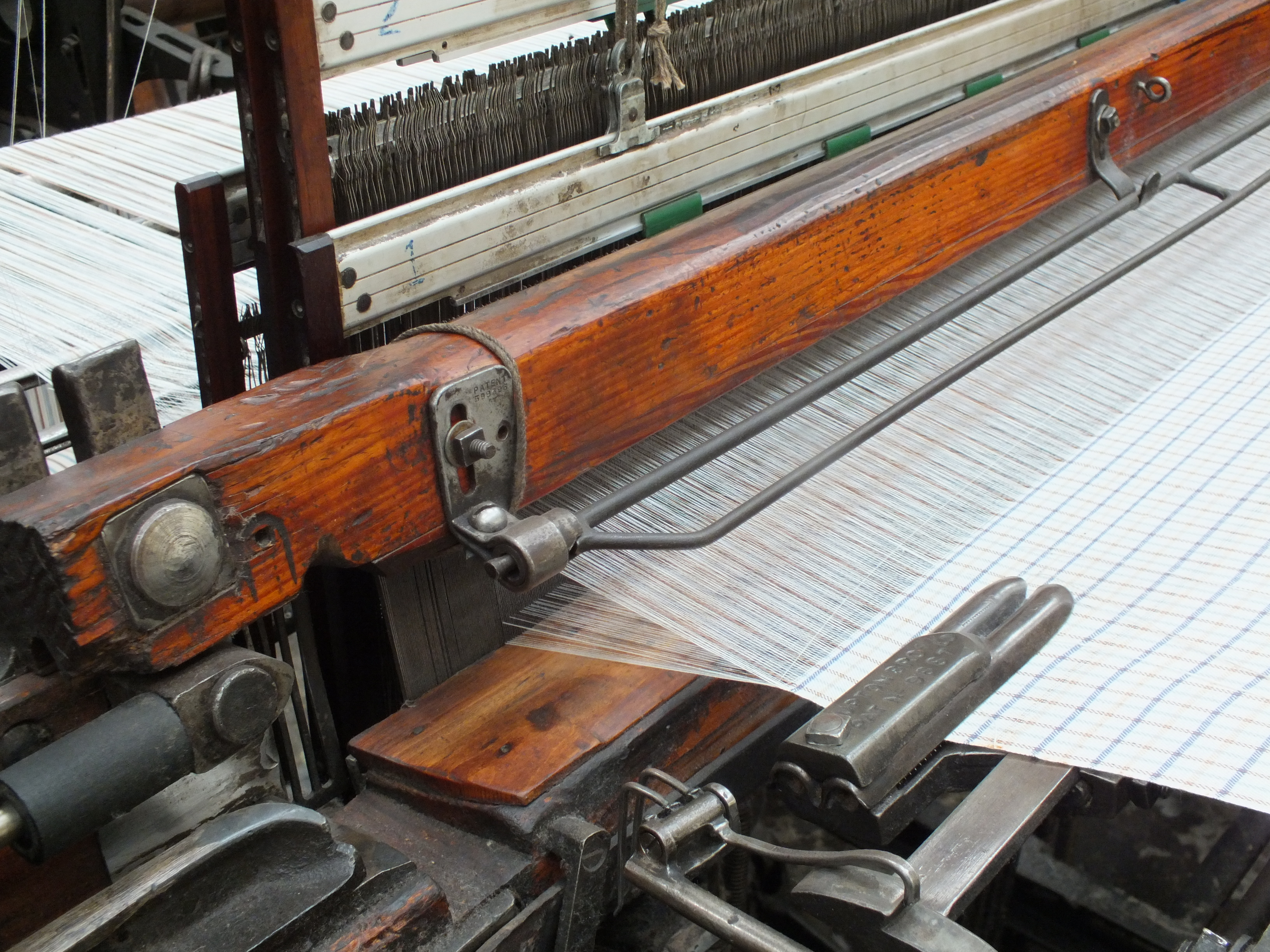

== See also ==
- Queen Street Mill
