= Diaper (disambiguation) =

Diaper may refer to:

- Diaper, an absorbent garment
- Diaper (cloth), a fabric having a diamond-shaped pattern formed by alternating directions of thread.
- Diapering, range of decorative patterns used in a variety of works of art, such as stained glass, heraldic shields, architecture, silverwork etc.
- "Diaper", a 1999 song by Meat Puppets from You Love Me
- Bertie Diaper (1909–1995), English footballer
- William Diaper (1685–1717), English clergyman, poet and translator of the Augustan era

== See also ==
- Diapir, a type of magma intrusion in geology
