= Horrocks loom =

Early power loom developed by William Horrocks in 1803

William Horrocks, a cotton manufacturer of Stockport built an early power loom in 1803, based on the principles of Cartwright but including some significant improvements to cloth take up and in 1813 battening.

== Power looms ==
Edmund Cartwright bought and patented a power loom in 1785, and it was this loom that was adopted by the nascent cotton industry in England. The silk loom made by Jacques Vaucanson in 1745 operated on the same principles but wasn't developed further. The invention of the flying shuttle by John Kay was critical to the development of a commercially successful power loom. Cartwright's loom was impractical but the ideas behind it were developed by numerous inventors in the Manchester area of England.

Cartwright's loom was little used; he established a powerloom factory at Doncaster in 1787 which closed after few years. Grimshaw's factory at Manchester, which opened in 1790 and contained twenty four Cartwright looms, was burnt down by protesting hand loom weavers. It is speculated that Cartwright's failure was due to the loom's wooden frame and crude construction, Cartwright's inexperience in business, and the lack of an adequate method to prepare the warp.

To prepare the loom, the warp threads needed to be strengthened by applying a wet size (a process called dressing) and then wound onto a beam or roller that fitted on the back of the loom (a process called warping or beaming). These processes were time-consuming; if dressing took place on the loom, the loom had to remain idle until the threads dried. Because of this, the economics of weaving still favoured the handloom weaver. It was William Radcliffe, also of Stockport, who introduced the dressing frame in 1803.

== Horrocks' loom ==
William Horrocks secured several patents to improve the loom. The Horrocks loom, introduced in 1803, featured an improved method of taking up the cloth onto the beam once it was woven. It had a metal frame, and was described as neat and compact so hundreds could be at work in a single room. As the warp was now dressed away from the loom, the Horrocks loom could be run continuously, being stopped only to piece broken threads and to replenish the weft in the shuttle. (Note: Radcliffe was also responsible for the 1802 hand operated metal "power-loom", the Dandy loom; this significantly improved the productivity of the hand loom weaver. The Dandy loom also had automated takeup, and benefited from off loom dressing.) In the vicinity of Stockport, approximately 2,000 looms were in use by 1818, and by 1821 there were 32 factories containing 5,732 looms. According to a 1830 report to the British House of Commons, by 1820 there were an estimated 14,150 power looms in both England and Scotland; that number increased to 55,500 by 1829. However, these counts were outnumbered 4 to 1 by the number of handlooms. Official figures (The Factories Inspectors' count) were first compiled in 1835 and they showed 108,189 power looms used for cotton, 1,713 for silk, 2,330 for wool and 2,846 for worsted, but not all of these would have been Horrocks looms; the 1830 Roberts Loom (based on 1822 patents) had become more popular.
