= Bertie Diaper =

English footballer

Personal information
- Full name: Albert William Frederick Diaper
- Date of birth: 11 February 1909
- Place of birth: Woolston, England
- Date of death: 25 May 1995 (aged 86)
- Place of death: Basingstoke, England
- Height: 5 ft 8 in (1.73 m)
- Position: Wing half

Senior career*
Years	Team	Apps	(Gls)
1928–	Cowes		
–1932	Arsenal	0	(0)
1932–1933	Luton Town	3	(0)
1933–1935	Fulham	3	(0)
1935–1936	Charlton Athletic	0	(0)
1936–1938	Aldershot	64	(0)
- Guildford City
- * Club domestic league appearances and goals

Albert William Frederick Diaper (11 February 1909 – 25 May 1995) was an English professional footballer who played in the Football League for Aldershot, Luton Town and Fulham as a wing half.

== Personal life ==
Diaper was a carpenter by trade.

== Career statistics ==
Appearances and goals by club, season and competition
Club	Season	League			FA Cup		Total	
Club	Season	Division	Apps	Goals	Apps	Goals	Apps	Goals
Luton Town	1932–33	Third Division South	3	0	0	0	3	0
Fulham	1933–34	Second Division	3	0	0	0	3	0
Career total			6	0	0	0	6	0
