= Diaper (cloth) =

Damask cloth with small patterns

Diaper is a damask cloth with small geometrical patterns such as bird's eye or diamond shapes. Terms such as “bird’s eye” or “pheasant’s eye” refer to the size of the diamond in the design. Diaper has been used as a tablecloth.

== Bird's eye pattern ==
Bird's eye pattern (nightingale's eye, bulbul chashm) is a geometrical pattern of a diamond shape similar to a bird's eye used in various types of cloth. Bulbul chashm ("chashm-e-bulbul") or nightingale's eye refers to a larger diamond shape with a dotted eye in the middle.

== Etymology ==
The etymology of the term "diaper" traces back to the Latin word "diasper," which denotes rough and uneven texture. The word passed through the Low Latin term "diasperus," which referred to a particular type of cloth. The weave is unusually absorbent, and is therefore used for baby diapers.

== History ==
“Diaper” refers to any small geometrical or floral pattern that consists of the constant repetition of one or more simple figure or units of design evenly spaced. The term was initially associated with silk with diamond patterns later applied to linen and cotton fabrics of similar designs.

== Structure ==
Diaper is made of linen and sometimes cotton or a combination of both.

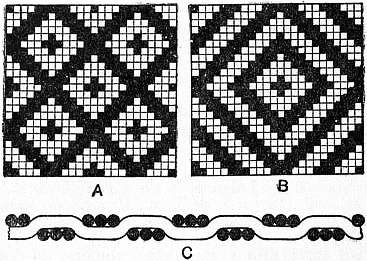
A diaper weave, that is a weave creating a diamond pattern in the cloth. Such cloth is quite absorbent and was therefore used for babies' nappies, also called diapers

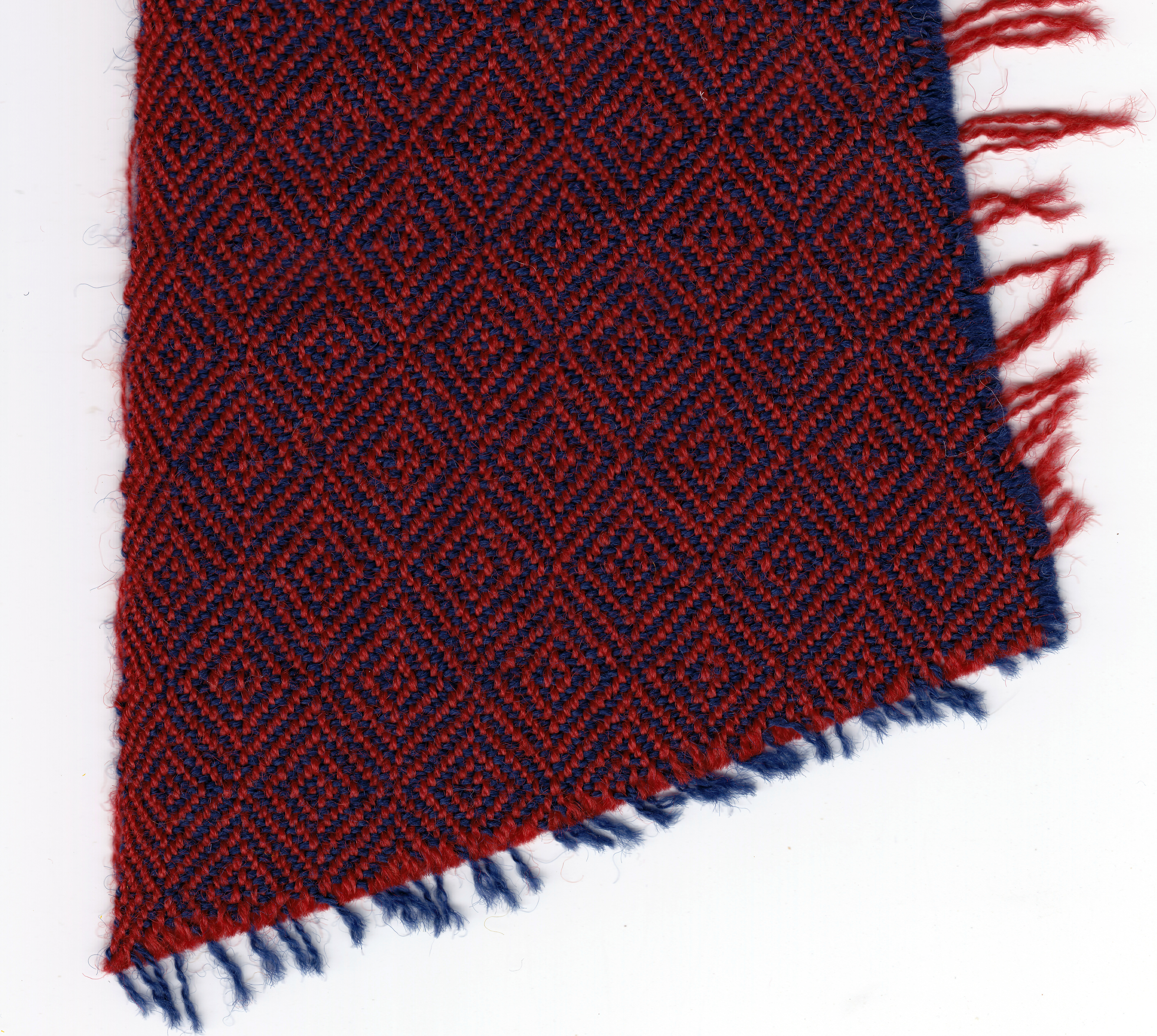
A similar weave, also called a diamond twill

== More applications of bird's eye pattern in textiles ==
The design's versatility in terms of textile materials received praise, and several other applications associated with the bird's eye pattern are worth mentioning. These include:

=== Weave ===
Silk fabrics with the bulbul design, made in Baghdad, were used in northern India in the 17th century. In these cloths, bulbul chrshum was woven with a yellow warp and a red weft, forming diamond patterns.

==== Khes weaving ====
Check patterns (''charkhana'', chequered) and ''Bulbul chashm'' are renowned patterns in Khes weaving.

==== Sari ====
A birds-eye pattern is used in saris, as well.

=== Embroidery ===
The pattern is also used In embroidery art such as phulkari.

== See also ==
- Diapering is any of a wide range of decorative patterns used in a variety of works of art, such as stained glass, heraldic shields, architecture, and silverwork. Its chief use is in the enlivening of plain surfaces.
