= Dandy loom =

Type of hand loom

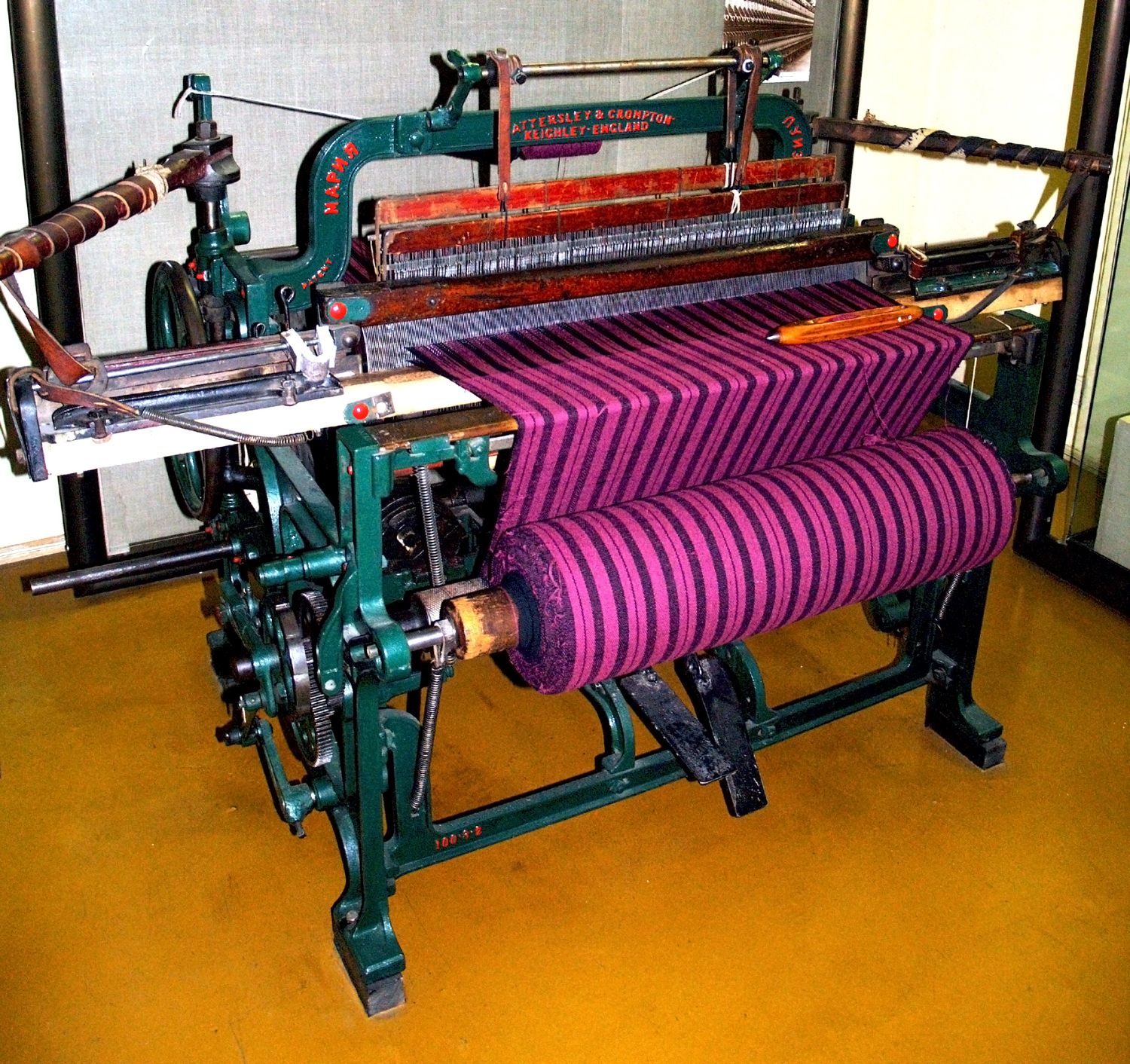
A treadle-operated Hattersley & Sons Domestic Loom, built under licence in 1893, in Keighley, Yorkshire. This loom has a flying shuttle and seems to have a dandy mechanism; it is not just controlled but powered by the pedals.

A Dandy loom is a hand loom that automatically ratchets the take-up beam. Each time the weaver moves the sley to beat-up the weft, a rachet and pawl mechanism advances the cloth roller. In 1802 William Ratcliffe of Stockport patented a Dandy loom with a cast-iron frame. It was this type of Dandy loom that was used in the small dandy loom shops.

== Economics ==
In the mid 1830s, there were about twice as many weavers operating a variety of different handlooms as there were power-looms. The dandy loom increased the productivity of a hand-loom weaver by 50%. The dandy-loom weaver would work in a small workshop and would rent the loom for 10 1/2d a week and in 1825 could expect to earn 5s a week.

Historian Geoffrey Timmins has tried to assess the relative importance of the hand-powered branch of the industry on the one hand and of the water- or steam-powered branches on the other. It is difficult: the output of power looms was certainly greater than that of the handlooms, but the handloom weavers produced higher quality cloths with greater profit margins. The weaving trade was only partially mechanised before about 1830, and so even so late as 1850, handloom weavers made up a sizeable minority of the total workforce.
