= Textile manufacturing =

Industry which produces textiles

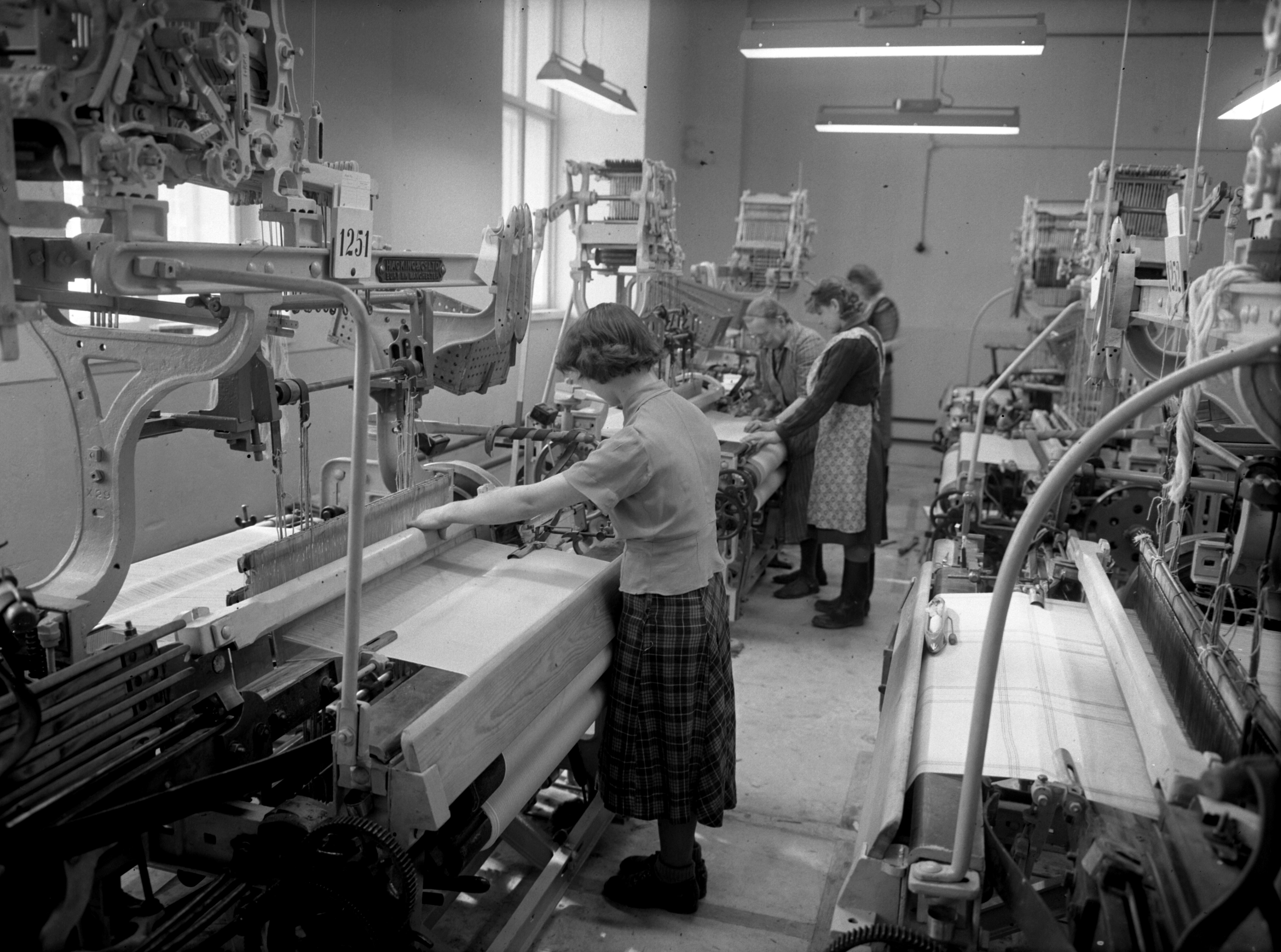
Weaving at Finlayson factory in Tampere, Finland (1951)

Textile manufacturing or textile engineering is a major industry. It is largely based on the conversion of fibre into yarn, then yarn into fabric. These are then dyed or printed, fabricated into cloth which is then converted into useful goods such as clothing, household items, upholstery and various industrial products.

Different types of fibres are used to produce yarn. Cotton remains the most widely used and common natural fiber making up 90% of all-natural fibers used in the textile industry. People often use cotton clothing and accessories because of comfort, not limited to different weathers. There are many variable processes available at the spinning and fabric-forming stages coupled with the complexities of the finishing and colouration processes to the production of a wide range of products.

== History ==
Textile manufacturing in the modern era is an evolved form of the art and craft industries. Until the 18th and 19th centuries, the textile industry was a household work. It became mechanised in the 18th and 19th centuries, and has continued to develop through science and technology since the twentieth century. Specifically, ancient civilizations in India, Egypt, China, sub-Saharan Africa, Eurasia, South America, and North and East Africa all had some forms of textile production. The first book about textile manufacturing is considered to be 'A Treatise on the Art of Weaving' by John Murphy.

== Processing of cotton ==
Cotton manufacturing processes
Bale breaker
Willowing
Breaker scutcher	Batting
Finishing scutcher	Lapping
Carding
Sliver lap
Combing
Drawing
Slubbing
Intermediate
Roving	Fine roving
Mule spinning	Ring spinning
Reeling
Winding	Bundling
Weaving shed
Beaming
Warping
Sizing/slashing/dressing
Weaving
Cloth	Yarn (cheese) Bundle

Blowing room
Teasing
Carding room
Spinning
Doubling
Bleaching
Winding
Cabling
Gassing
Spooling
Sewing thread

Cotton is the world's most important natural fibre. In the year 2007, the global yield was 25 million tons from 35 million hectares cultivated in more than 50 countries.

There are six stages to the manufacturing of cotton textiles:

- Cultivating and Harvesting
- Preparatory Processes
- Spinning
- Weaving or Knitting
- Finishing
- Marketing

=== Cultivating and harvesting ===
Cotton is grown in locations with long, hot, dry summers with plenty of sunshine and low humidity. Indian cotton, Gossypium arboreum, is finer but the staple is only suitable for hand processing. American cotton, Gossypium hirsutum, produces the longer staple needed for mechanised textile production. The planting season is from September to mid-November, and the crop is harvested between March and June. The cotton bolls are harvested by stripper harvesters and spindle pickers that remove the entire boll from the plant. The cotton boll is the seed pod of the cotton plant; attached to each of the thousands of seeds are fibres about 2.5 cm long. There is a higher rate of cotton being produced compared to the actual workers needed to produce the material. In 2013 a cotton farmer in Mississippi, Bower Flowers, produced around 13,000 bales of cotton in that year alone. This amount of cotton could be used to produce up to 9.4 million T-shirts.

==== Ginning ====
The seed cotton goes into a cotton gin. The cotton gin separates seeds and removes the "trash" (dirt, stems and leaves) from the fibre. In a saw gin, circular saws grab the fibre and pull it through a grating that is too narrow for the seeds to pass. A roller gin is used with longer-staple cotton. Here, a leather roller captures the cotton. A knife blade, set close to the roller, detaches the seeds by drawing them through teeth in circular saws and revolving brushes which clean them away. The ginned cotton fibre, known as lint, is then compressed into bales which are about 1.5 m tall and weigh almost 220 kg. Only 33% of the crop is usable lint. Commercial cotton is graded and priced according to its quality; this broadly relates to the average length of the staple and the variety of the plant. Longer-staple cotton (2½ in to 1¼ in) is called Egyptian, medium staple (1¼ in to ¾ in) is called American upland, and short staple (less than ¾ in) is called Indian. The cotton seed is pressed into cooking oil. The husks and meal are processed into animal feed, and the stems into paper.

=== Preparatory processes – preparation of yarn ===
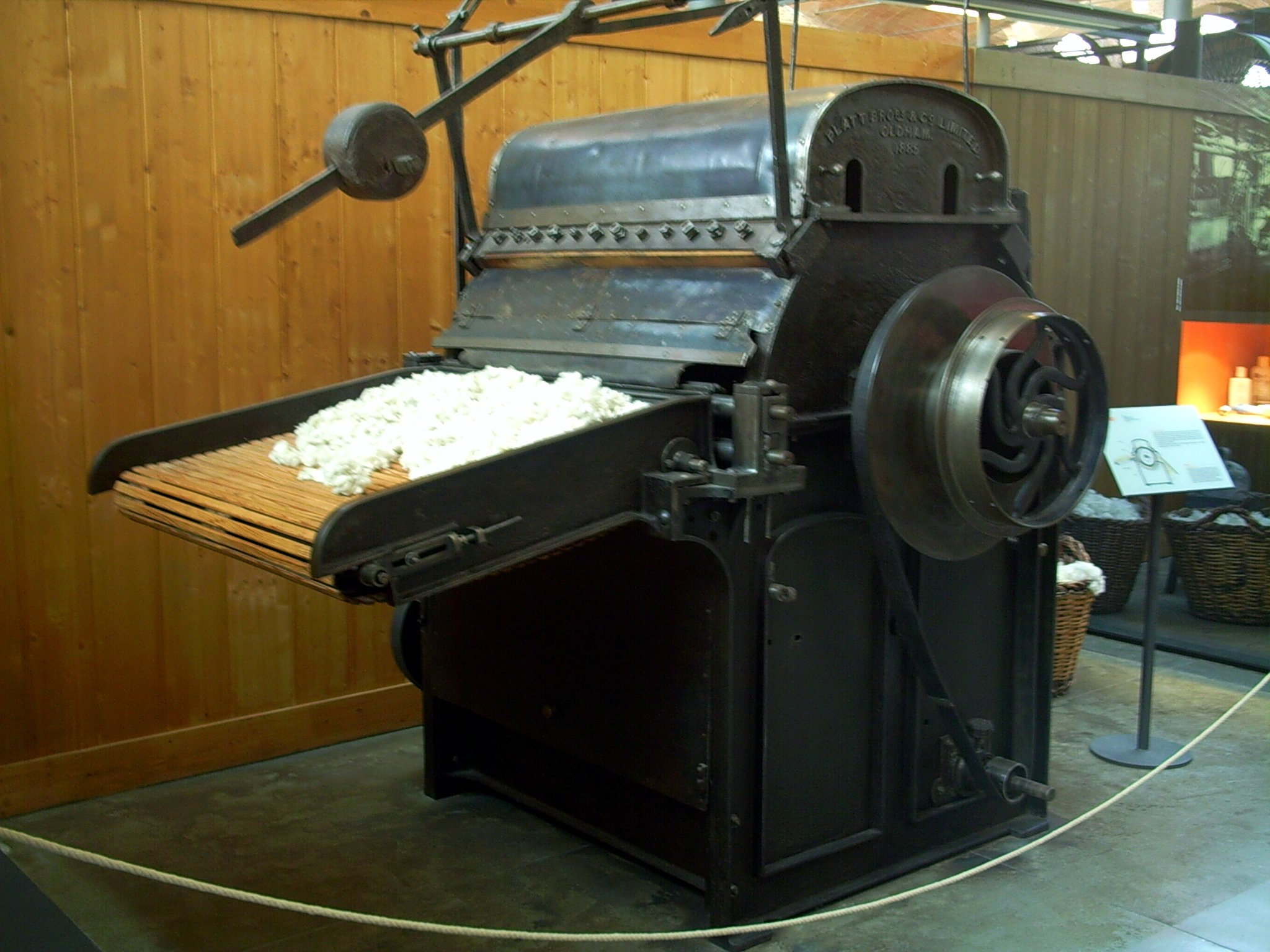
Platt Bros. picker

==== Ginning, bale-making and transportation ====
Ginning, bale-making and transportation are done in the country of origin.

==== Opening and cleaning ====
Cotton is shipped to mills in large 500-pound bales. When the cotton comes out of a bale, it is all packed together and still contains vegetable matter. The bale is broken open using a machine with large spikes, called an opener. To fluff up the cotton and remove the vegetable matter, the cotton is sent through a picker or a similar machine. In a picker, the cotton is beaten with a beater bar to loosen it up. It is then fed through various rollers, which serve to remove the vegetable matter. The cotton, aided by fans, then collects on a screen and gets fed through more rollers where it emerges as a continuous soft fleecy sheet, known as a lap.

==== Blending, mixing and scutching ====
Scutching refers to the process of cleaning cotton of its seeds and other impurities. The first scutching machine was invented in 1797, but did not come into further mainstream use until after 1808 or 1809, when it was introduced and used in Manchester, England. By 1816, it had become generally adopted. The scutching machine worked by passing the cotton through a pair of rollers, and then striking it with iron or steel bars called beater bars or beaters. The beaters, which turn very quickly, strike the cotton hard and knock the seeds out. This process is done over a series of parallel bars so as to allow the seeds to fall through. At the same time, air is blown across the bars, which carries the cotton into a cotton chamber.

==== Carding ====
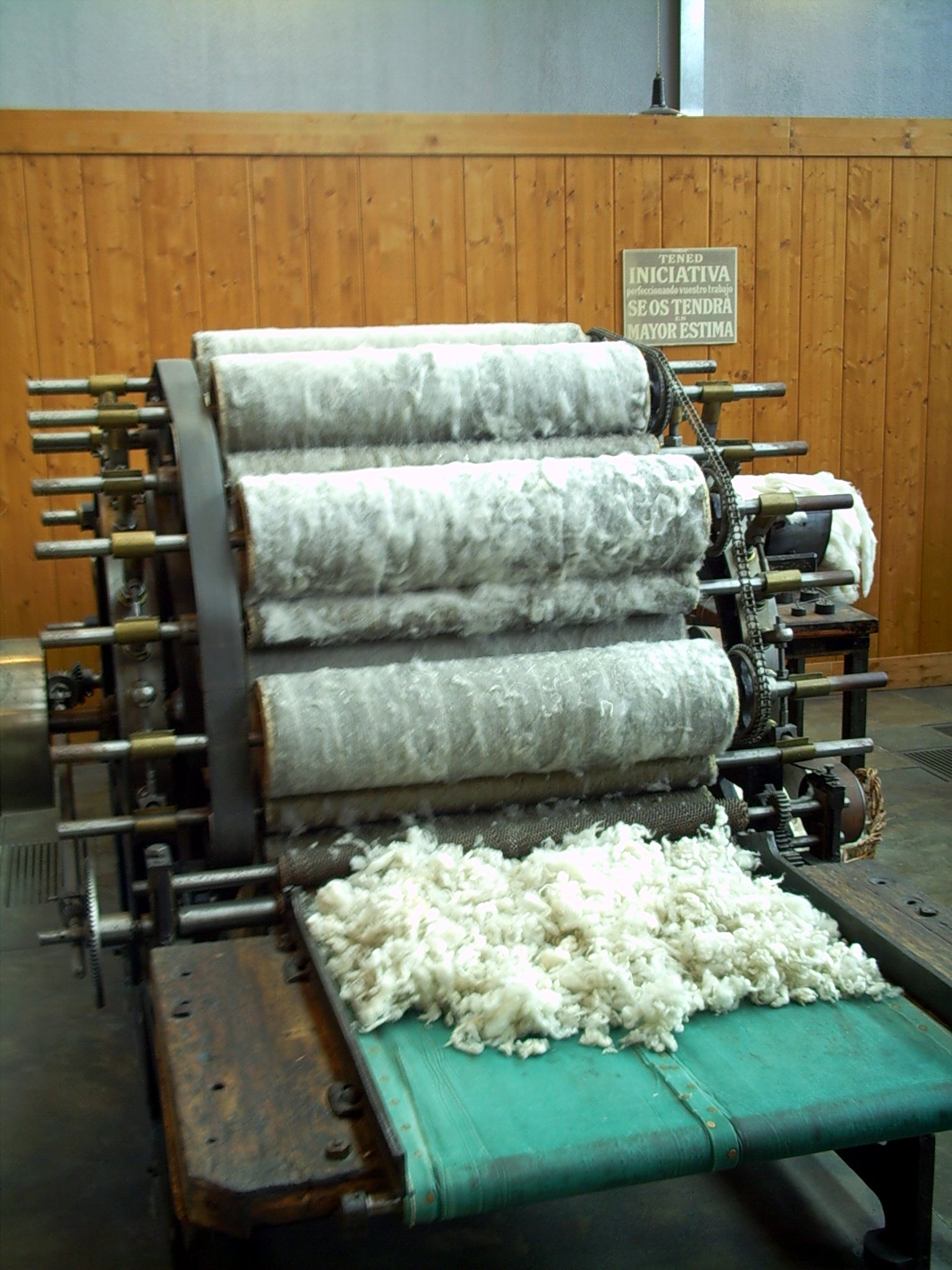
Carding machine

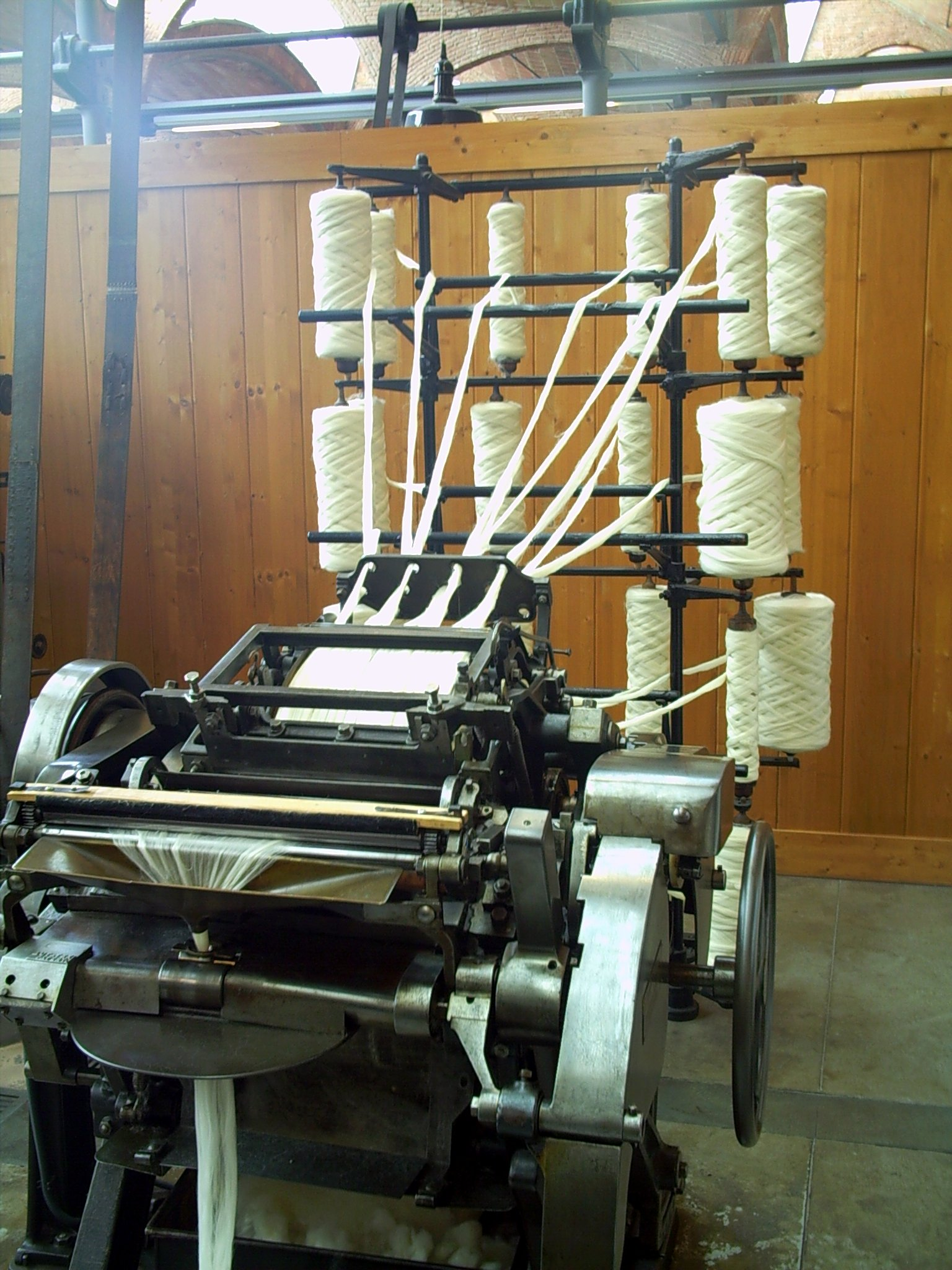
A Combing machine

In the carding process, the fibres are separated and then assembled into a loose strand (sliver or tow). The cotton comes off of the picking machine in laps, and is then taken to carding machines. The carders line up the fibres neatly to make them easier to spin. The carding machine consists mainly of one big roller with smaller ones surrounding it. All of the rollers are covered in small teeth, and as the cotton is moved forwards, the teeth get finer (i.e. closer together). The cotton leaves the carding machine in the form of a sliver: a large rope of fibres. In a wider sense, carding can refer to these four processes:

- Willowing: loosening the fibres
- Lapping: removing the dust to create a flat sheet or lap of cotton
- Carding: combing the tangled lap into a thick rope of 1/2 inch in diameter, a sliver
- Drawing: where a drawing frame combines 4 slivers into one, repeated for increased quality

Combing is optional, but is used to remove the shorter fibres, creating a stronger yarn.

Several slivers are combined. Each sliver will have thin and thick spots, and by combining several slivers together, a more consistent size can be reached. Since combining several slivers produces a very thick rope of cotton fibres, the slivers are separated into rovings. Generally speaking, for machine processing, a roving is about the width of a pencil. These rovings (or slubbings) are then what are used in the spinning process.

=== Spinning – yarn manufacture ===
==== Spinning ====
Most spinning today is done using break, or open-end spinning. This is a technique where the fibres are blown by air into a rotating drum, where they attach themselves to the tail of formed yarn that is continually being drawn out of the chamber. Other methods of break spinning use needles and electrostatic forces. This method has replaced the older methods of ring and mule spinning. It is also easily adapted for artificial fibres.

The spinning machines takes the roving, thins it and twists it, creating yarn which it winds onto a bobbin.

In mule spinning the roving is pulled off a bobbin and fed through rollers, which are feeding at several different speeds. This thins the roving at a consistent rate. If the roving was not a consistent size, then this step could cause a break in the yarn, or jam the machine. The yarn is twisted through the spinning of the bobbin as the carriage moves out, and is rolled onto a cylinder called a spindle, which then produces a cone-shaped bundle of fibres known as a "cop", as the carriage returns. Mule spinning produces a finer thread than ring spinning.

The mule was an intermittent process, as the frame advanced and returned a distance of five feet. It was the descendant of the 1779 Crompton device. It produces a softer, less twisted thread that was favoured for fine fabrics and wefts.

The ring was a descendant of the Arkwright Water frame of 1769. It was a continuous process, the yarn was coarser, had a greater twist and was stronger, thus suitable for use as warp thread. Ring spinning is slow due to the distance the thread must pass around the ring.

Sewing thread was made of several threads twisted together, or doubled.

==== Checking ====
This is the process where each of the bobbins is rewound to give a tighter bobbin.

==== Folding and twisting ====
Plying is done by pulling yarn from two or more bobbins and twisting it together, in a direction opposite to the one it was spun in. Depending on the weight desired, the cotton may or may not be plied, and the number of strands twisted together varies.

==== Gassing ====
Gassing is the process of passing yarn very rapidly through a series of Bunsen gas flames in a gassing frame, to burn off the projecting fibres and to make the thread round and smooth and bright. Only the better qualities of yarn are gassed, like the kinds used for voiles, poplins, venetians, gabardines, Egyptian cottons, etc. The thread loses around 5-8% of its weight if it's gassed. The gassed yarn is darker in shade afterwards, but should not be scorched.

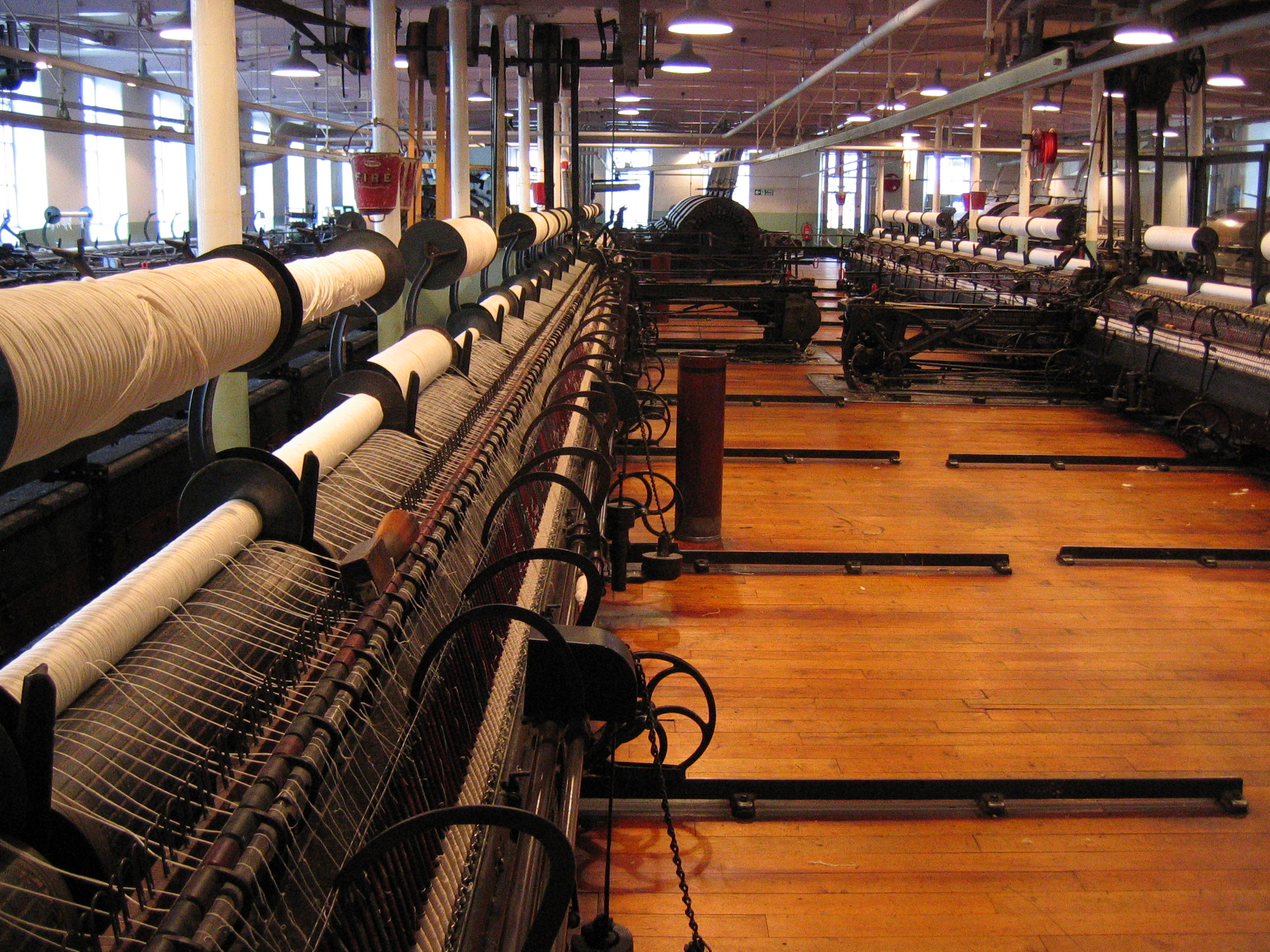
Mule spinning

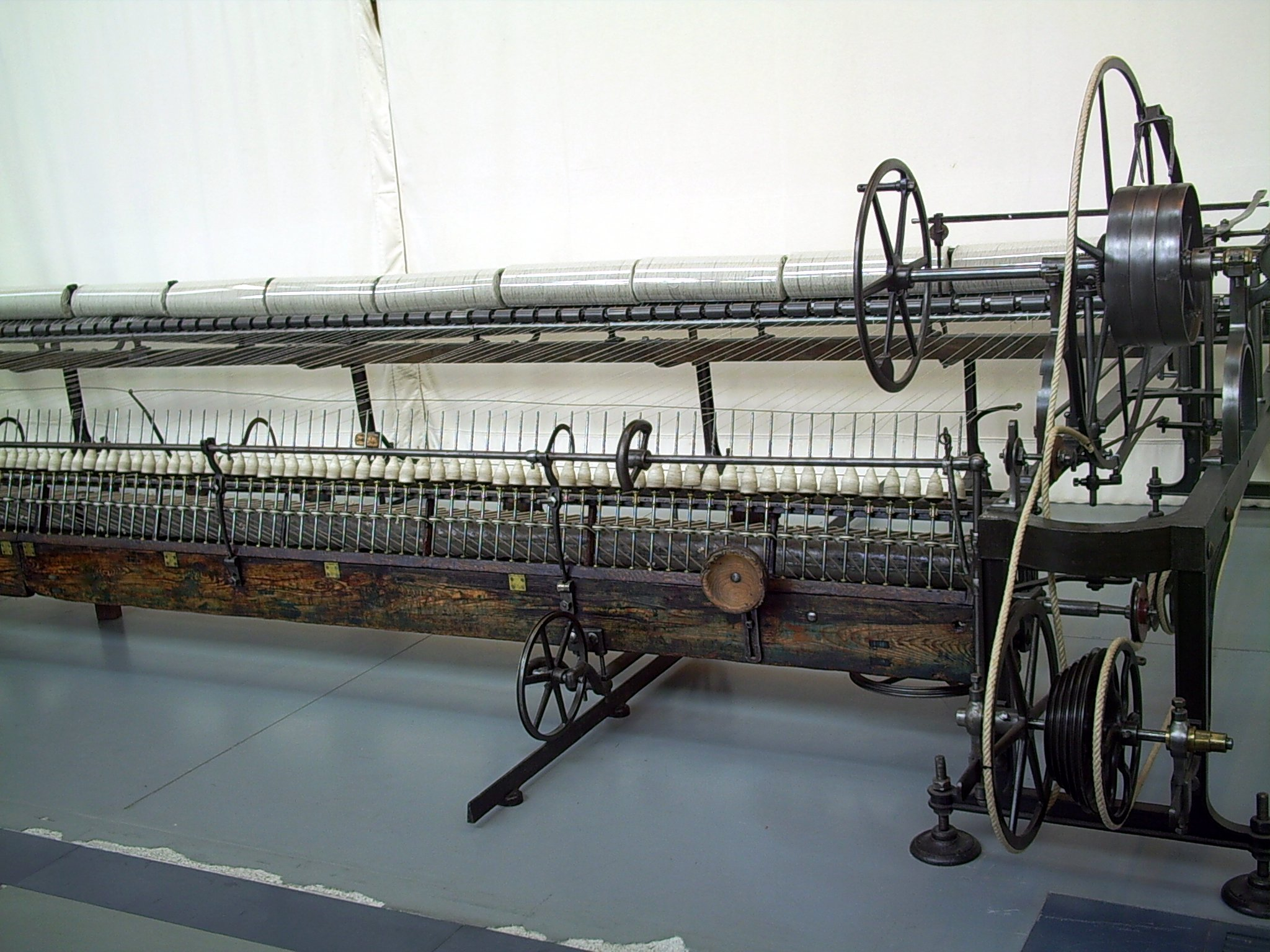
Mule spinning

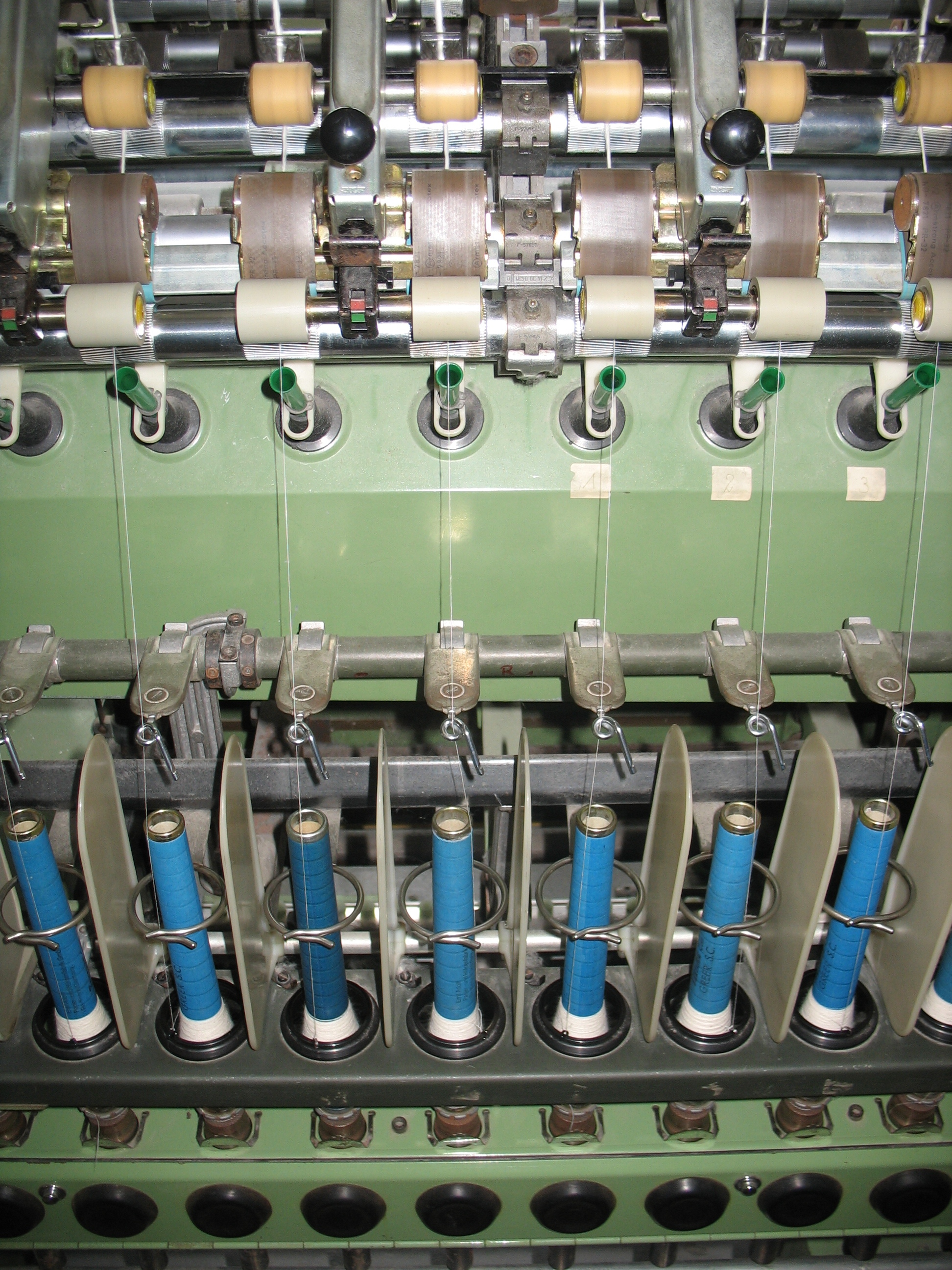
Ring spinning

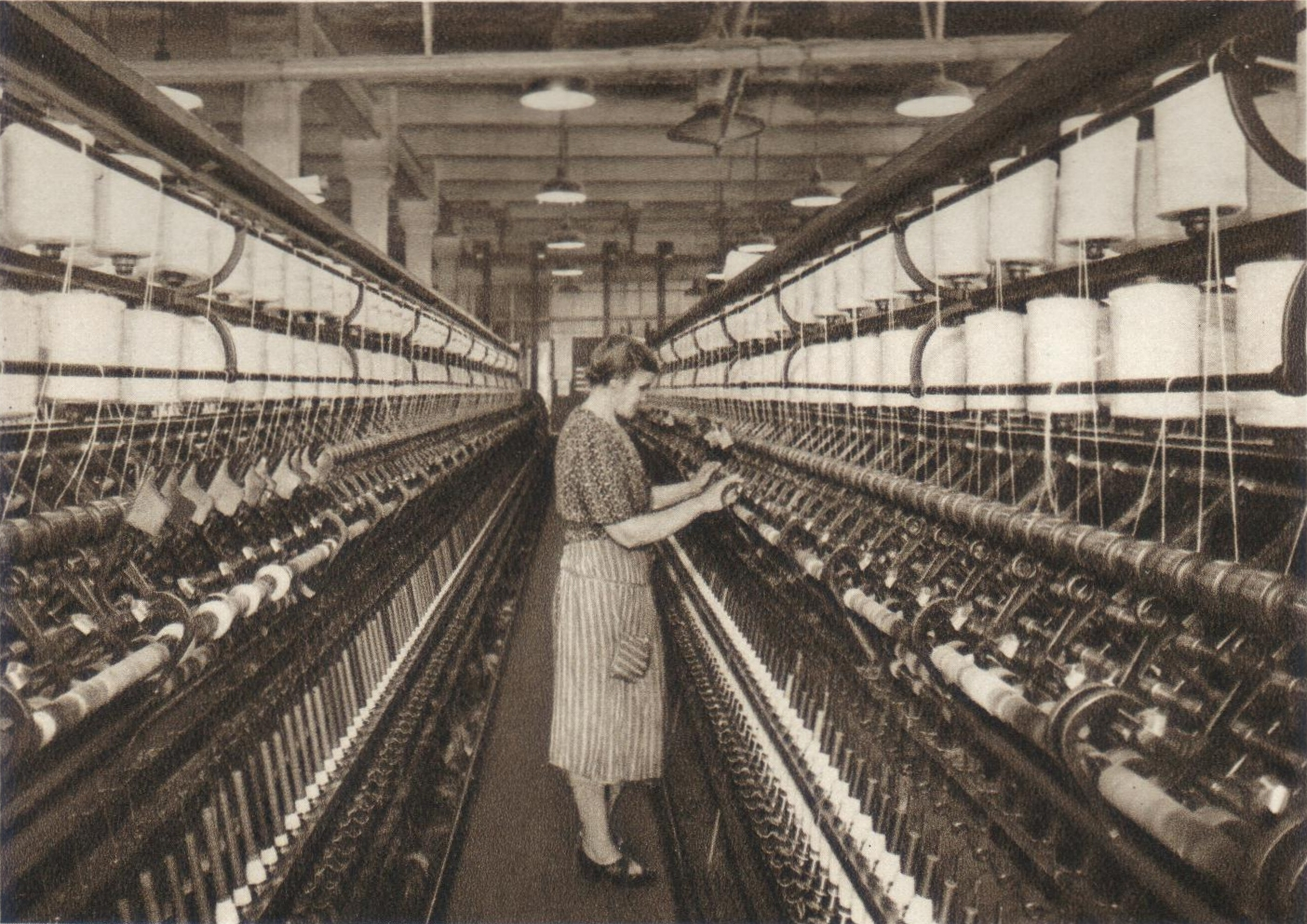
Ring spinning

==== Measurements ====
- Cotton Counts: Refers to the thickness of the cotton yarn where 840 yards of yarns weighs 1 pound (0.45 kg). 10-count cotton means that 8,400 yards (7,700 m) of yarn weighs 1 pound (0.45 kg). This is coarser than 40-count cotton where 40x840 yards are needed. In the United Kingdom, counts from 10 to 40 are coarse (Oldham Counts), 40 to 80 are medium counts and above 80 is a fine count. In the United States ones, counts up to the 20s are coarse counts.
- Hank: A length of 7 leas or 840 yards (the worsted hank is only 560 yd)
- Thread: A length of 54 in (the circumference of a warp beam)
- Bundle: Usually 10 lb
- Lea: A length of 80 threads or 120 yards
- Denier: this is an alternative method. It is defined as a number that is equivalent to the weight in grams of 9000m of a single yarn. 15 denier is finer than 30 denier.
- Tex: is the weight in grams of 1 km of yarn.

=== Weaving ===
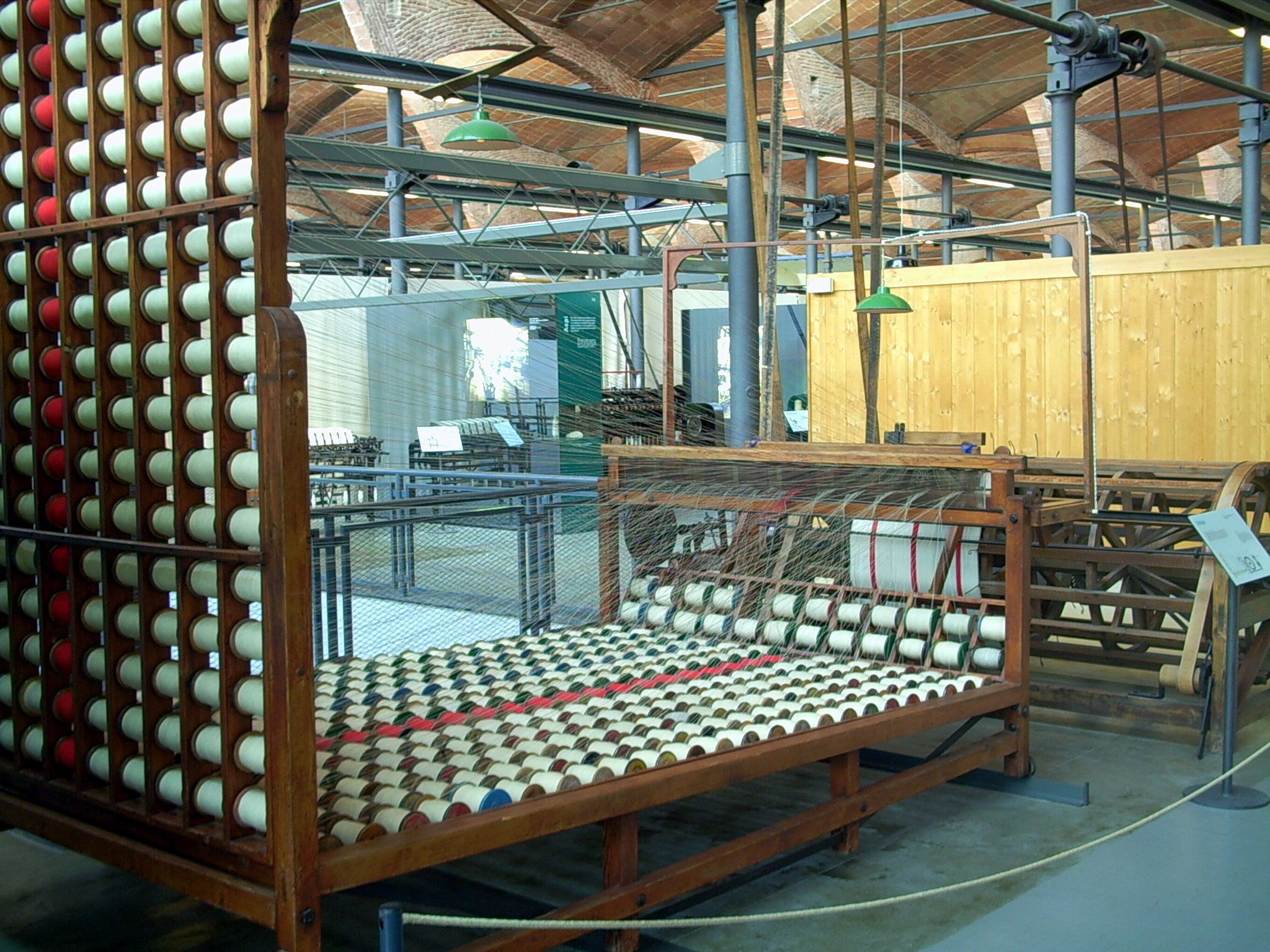
A Warper

The weaving process uses a loom. The lengthwise threads are known as the warp, and the crosswise threads are known as the weft. The warp, which must be strong, needs to be presented to loom on a warp beam. The weft passes across the loom in a shuttle that carries the yarn on a pirn. These pirns are automatically changed by the loom. Thus, the yarn needs to be wrapped onto a beam, and onto pirns before weaving can commence.

==== Winding ====
After being spun and plied, the cotton thread is taken to a warping room where the winding machine takes the required length of yarn and winds it onto warpers' bobbins.

==== Warping or beaming ====
Racks of bobbins are set up to hold the thread while it is wound onto the warp beam of a loom. Because the thread is fine, often three of these would be combined to get the desired number of ends.

==== Sizing ====
A sizing machine is needed for strengthening the warp by adding starch, to reduce breakage.

==== Drawing in, Looming ====
The process of drawing each end of the warp separately through the dents of the reed and the eyes of the healds, in the order indicated by the draft.

==== Pirning (processing the weft) ====
A pirn-winding frame was used to transfer the weft from cheeses of yarn onto the pirns that would fit into the shuttle.

==== Weaving ====
At this point, the thread is woven. Depending on the era, one person could manage anywhere from 3 to 100 machines. In the mid-nineteenth century, four was the standard number. A skilled weaver in 1925 could run 6 Lancashire Looms. As time progressed, new mechanisms were added that stopped the loom any time something went wrong. The mechanisms checked for such things as broken warp or weft threads, the shuttle going straight across, and if the shuttle was empty. Forty of these Northrop Looms or automatic looms could be operated by one skilled worker.

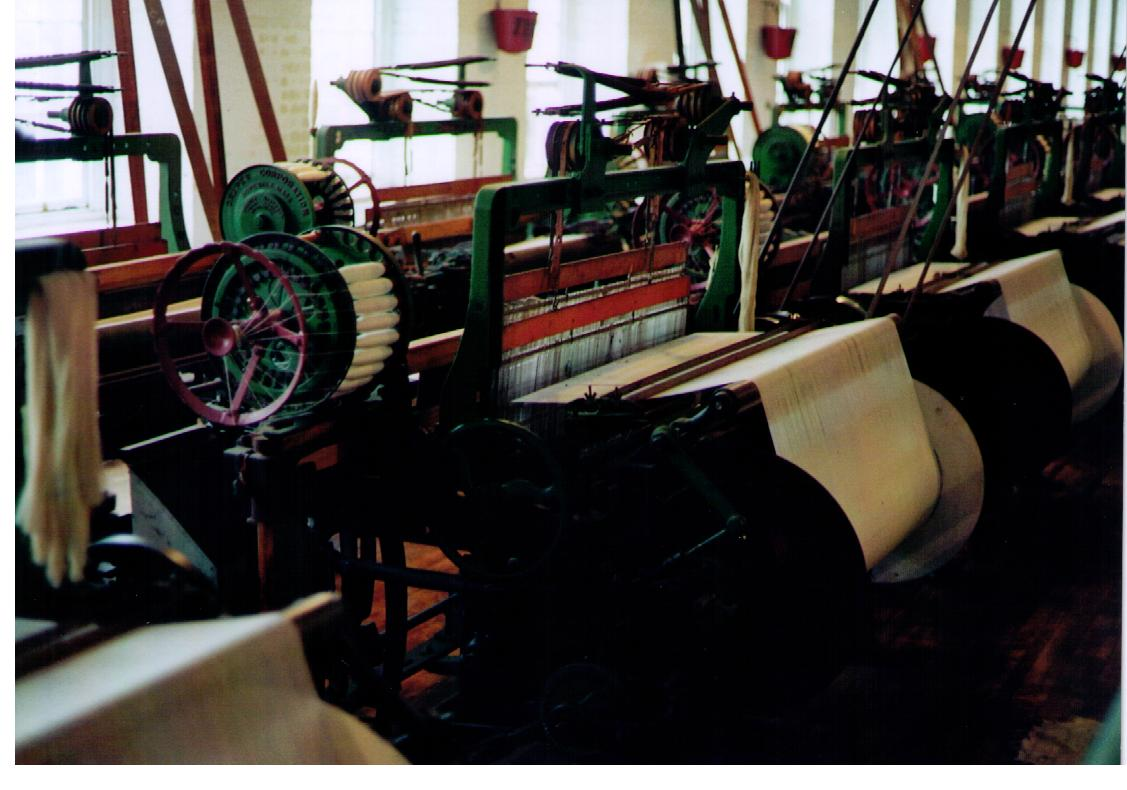
A Draper loom in the textile museum, Lowell, Massachusetts

The three primary movements of a loom are shedding, picking, and beating-up.

- Shedding: The operation of dividing the warp into two lines so that the shuttle can pass between these lines. There are two general kinds of sheds: "open" and "closed." In an open shed, the warp threads are moved from one line to the other when the pattern requires it. In a closed shed, the warp threads are all placed level.
- Picking: The operation of projecting the shuttle from side to side of the loom through the division in the warp threads. This is done by the overpick or underpick motions. The overpick is suitable for quick-running looms, whereas the underpick is best for heavy or slow looms.
- Beating-up: The third primary movement of the loom when making cloth: the action of the reed as it drives each pick of weft to the fell of the cloth.

The Lancashire Loom was the first semi-automatic loom. Jacquard looms and Dobby looms are looms that have sophisticated methods of shedding. They may be separate looms or mechanisms added to a plain loom. A Northrop Loom was fully automatic and was mass-produced between 1909 and the mid-1960s. Modern looms run faster and do not use a shuttle: there are air jet looms, water jet looms, and rapier looms.

==== Measurements ====
Ends and Picks: Picks refer to the weft, ends refer to the warp. The coarseness of the cloth can be expressed as the number of picks and ends per quarter-inch square, or per inch square. Ends is always written first. For example: Heavy domestics are made from coarse yarns, such as 10's to 14's warp and weft, and about 48 ends and 52 picks.

==== Associated job titles ====
Associated job titles include piecer, scavenger, weaver, tackler, draw boy.

==== Issues ====
When a hand loom was located in the home, children helped with the weaving process from an early age. Piecing needs dexterity, and a child can be as productive as an adult. When weaving moved from the home to the mill, children were often allowed to help their older sisters, and laws had to be made to prevent child labour from becoming established. The working conditions of cotton production were often harsh, with long hours, low pay, and dangerous machinery. Children, above all, were also prone to physical abuse and often forced to work in unsanitary conditions. It should also be noted that children who worked in handlooms often faced extreme poverty and were unable to obtain an education.

=== Knitting – fabric manufacture ===
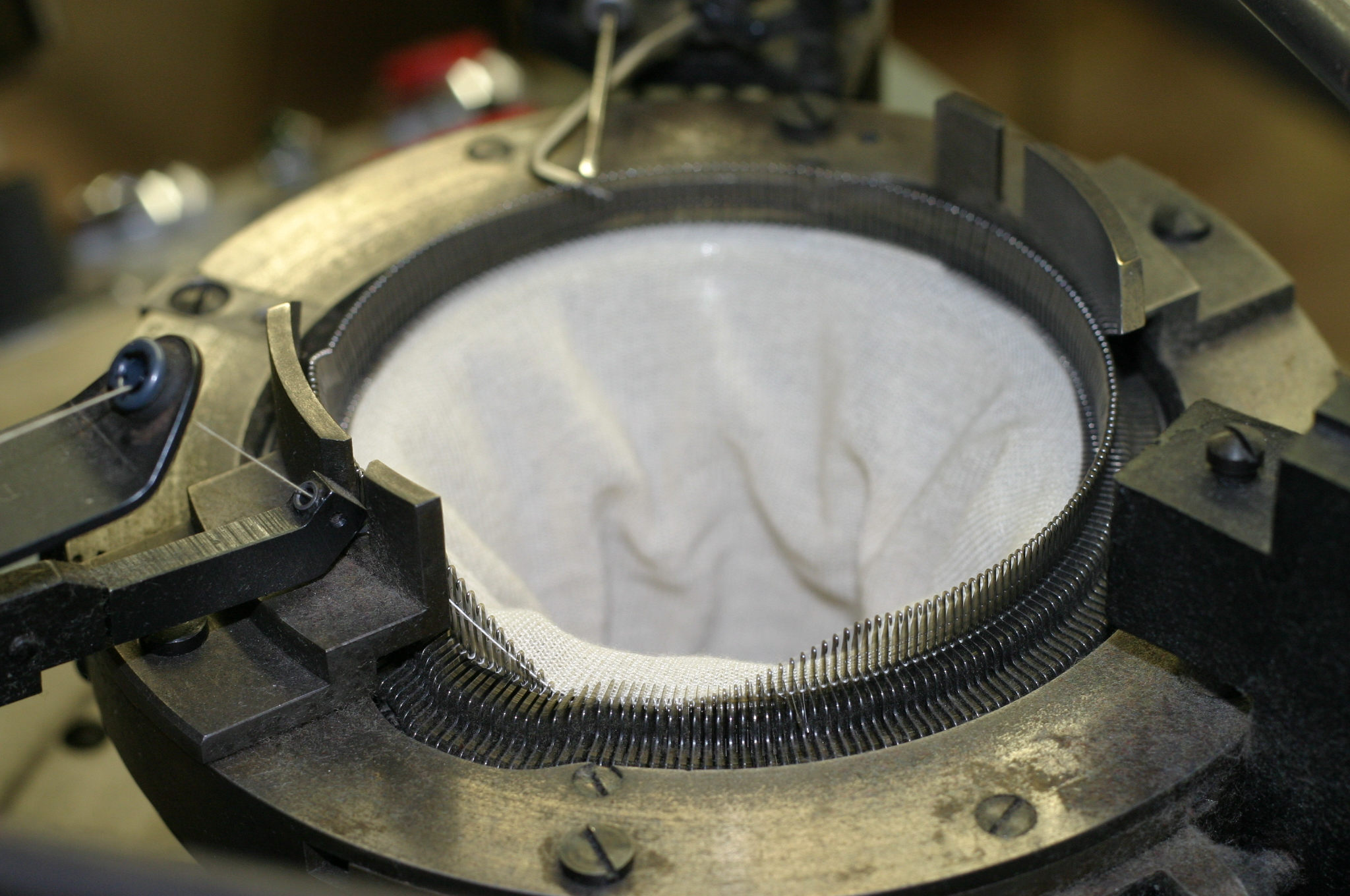
A circular knitting machine.

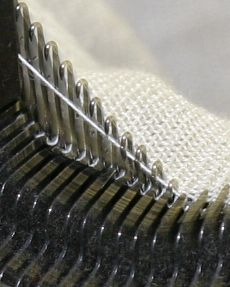
Close-up on the needles.

Knitting by machine is done in two different ways; warp and weft. Weft knitting (as seen in the pictures) is similar in method to hand knitting with stitches all connected to each other horizontally. Various weft machines can be configured to produce textiles from a single spool of yarn or multiple spools, depending on the size of the machine cylinder (in which the needles are bedded). In a warp knit, there are many pieces of yarn and there are vertical chains, zigzagged together by crossing the cotton yarn.

Warp knits do not stretch as much as a weft knits, and they are run-resistant. A weft knit is not run-resistant, but it has more stretch. This is especially true if spools of elastane are processed from separate spool containers and interwoven through the cylinder with cotton yarn, giving the finished product more flexibility and preventing it from having a 'baggy' appearance. The average t-shirt is a weft knit.

=== Finishing – processing of textiles ===
Finishing is a broad range of physical and chemical processes/treatments that complete one stage of textile manufacturing, sometimes in preparation for the next step. Finishing adds value to the product and makes it more attractive, useful and functional for the end-user. Fresh off the loom, cotton fabric not only contains impurities, including warp size, but it also requires further treatment to develop its full potential and to add to its value.

==== Desizing ====
Depending on the size that has been used, the cloth may be steeped in a dilute acid and then rinsed, or enzymes may be used to break down the size.

==== Scouring ====
Scouring is a chemical washing process carried out on cotton fabric to remove natural waxes and non-fibrous impurities (like the remains of seed fragments) from the fibres and any soiling or dirt that might remain. Scouring is usually carried out in iron vessels called kiers. The fabric is boiled in an alkali solution, which forms a soap with free fatty acids. A kier is usually enclosed, so the solution of sodium hydroxide can be boiled under pressure, excluding oxygen, which would degrade the cellulose in the fibre. If the appropriate reagents are used, scouring will also remove size from the fabric, although desizing often precedes scouring and is considered to be a separate process. Preparation and scouring are prerequisites to most of the other finishing processes. At this stage, even the most naturally white cotton fibres are yellowish, and bleaching is required.

==== Bleaching ====
Bleaching improves whiteness by removing natural colouration and whatever impurities remain in the cotton; the degree of bleaching is determined by the levels of whiteness and absorbency required of the fabric. Cotton, being a vegetable fibre, is bleached using an oxidizing agent, such as diluted sodium hypochlorite or diluted hydrogen peroxide. If the fabric is to be dyed a deep shade, then lower levels of bleaching are acceptable. However, for white bedding and for medical applications, the highest levels of whiteness and absorbency are essential.

==== Mercerising ====
A further possibility is mercerising, during which the fabric is treated with a caustic soda solution, to cause swelling of the fibres. This results in improved lustre, strength and dye affinity. Cotton is mercerised under tension, and all alkali must be washed out before the tension is released, or shrinkage will take place.

Many other chemical treatments may be applied to cotton fabrics to produce low flammability, crease-resistance and other qualities, but the four most important non-chemical finishing treatments are:

==== Singeing ====
Singeing is designed to burn off the surface fibres from the fabric to produce smoothness. The fabric passes over brushes to raise the fibres, then passes over a plate heated by gas flames.

==== Raising ====
During raising, the fabric surface is treated with sharp teeth to lift the surface fibres, thereby imparting downiness, softness and warmth, as in flannelette.

==== Calendering ====
Calendering is a process in which the fabric is passed between heated rollers to generate smooth, polished or embossed effects.

==== Shrinking (sanforising) ====
Sanforisation is a form of mechanical pre-shrinking, so that the fabric will shrink less upon laundering.

==== Dyeing ====
Dyeing is commonly carried out with an anionic direct dye by completely immersing the fabric (or yarn) in an aqueous dye bath according to a prescribed procedure. For improved fastness to washing, rubbing and light, further dyeing methods can be used. These require more complex chemistry during processing, and are thus more expensive to apply.

==== Printing ====
Printing is the application of colour in the form of a paste or ink to the surface of a fabric in a predetermined pattern. It can be described as a form of localised dyeing. Printing designs onto previously dyed fabric is also possible.

=== Economic, environmental and political consequences of cotton manufacture ===
Production of cotton requires arable land. In addition, cotton is farmed intensively and uses large amounts of fertilizer and 25% of the world's insecticides. Native Indian varieties of cotton were rainwater fed, but modern hybrids used for the mills need irrigation, which spreads pests. The 5% of cotton-bearing land in India uses 55% of all pesticides used in India.

The consumption of energy in form of water and electricity is relatively high, especially in processes like washing, de-sizing, bleaching, rinsing, dyeing, printing, coating and finishing. Processing is time-consuming. The major portion of water in textile industry is used for wet processing of textile (70 per cent). Approximately 25 per cent of energy in the total textile production like fibre production, spinning, twisting, weaving, knitting, clothing manufacturing etc. is used in dyeing. About 34 per cent of energy is consumed in spinning, 23 per cent in weaving, 38 per cent in chemical wet processing and five per cent in miscellaneous processes. Power dominates consumption pattern in spinning and weaving, while thermal energy is the major factor for chemical wet processing.

Cotton acts as a carbon sink as it contains cellulose and this contains 44.44% carbon. However, due to carbon emissions from fertiliser application, use of mechanized tools to harvest the cotton and so forth cotton manufacture tends to emit more CO_{2} than is stored in the form of cellulose.

The growth of cotton is divided into two segments i.e. organic and genetically modified. Cotton crop provides livelihood to millions of people but its production is becoming expensive because of high water consumption, use of expensive pesticides, insecticides and fertiliser. Genetically modified products aim to increase disease resistance and reduce the water required. The organic sector in India was worth $583 million. Genetically modified cotton, in 2007, occupied 43% of cotton growing areas in India.

Before mechanisation, cotton was harvested manually by farmers in India and by African slaves in America. In 2012 Uzbekistan was a major exporter of cotton and uses manual labour during the harvest. Human rights groups have expressed concerns over healthcare professionals and children being forced to pick cotton.

There was a 1.5 million tonne cotton deficit in 2018 due to adverse weather conditions, limited water, and pest issues.

== Processing of other vegetable fibres ==
=== Flax ===
Flax is a bast fibre, which comes in bundles in the stem of the Linum usitatissimum plant. The plant flowers and is harvested. It is subjected to retting, breaking, scutching, hackling or combing. It is then treated like cotton.

=== Jute ===
Jute is a bast fibre, which comes from the stem of the plants of the Corchorus genus. It is retted like flax, sundried and baled. When spinning a small amount of oil must be added to the fibre. It can be bleached and dyed. It was used for sacks and bags but is now used for the backing for carpets. Jute can be blended with other fibres to make composite fabrics and work continues in Bangladesh to refine the processes and extend the range of usage possible. In the 1970s, jute-cotton composite fabrics were known as jutton fabrics.

=== Hemp ===
Hemp is a bast fibre from the stem of Cannabis sativa. It is difficult to bleach, and is used for making cord and rope. It is subject to retting, separating and pounding

=== Other bast fibres ===
Other bast fibres used increasingly with the goal of ecological textile production include kenaf, ramie, nettle, and urena.

=== Other leaf fibres ===
Sisal is the main leaf fibre used; others are abacá and henequen.

== Processing of wool and silk ==
=== Wool ===
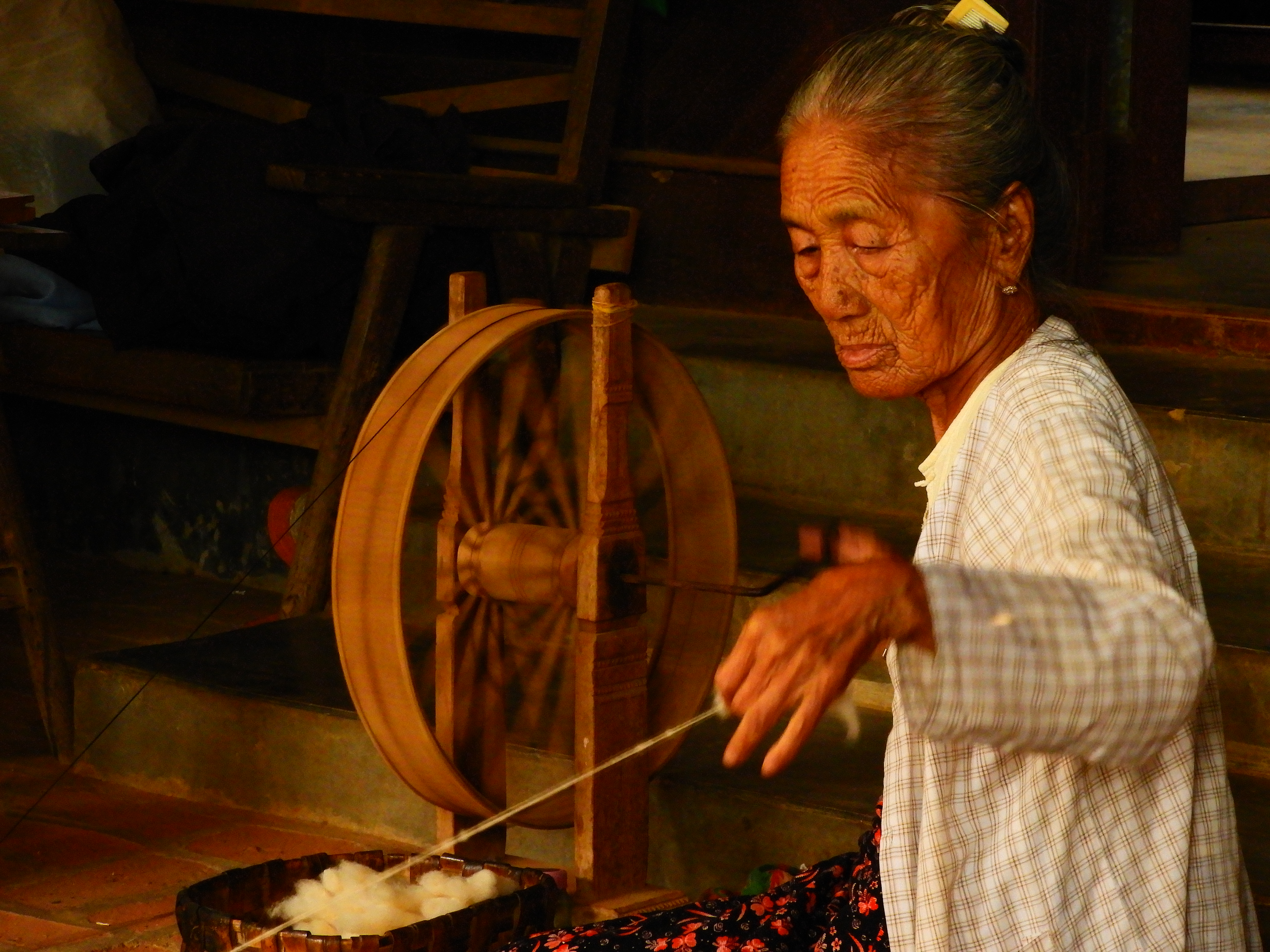
Traditional spinner in her family's house in Old Bagan, Myanmar (2019).

Wool comes from domesticated sheep. It is used to create two kinds of yarn, woolens and worsteds. These are distinguished by the direction of the wool fibres in relation to the thread; woolens are perpendicularly arranged, allowing for fluffy yarns that trap air, while worsteds have parallel fibres, creating a strong and smooth yarn.

Modern sheep have uniform fleeces, while primitive and landrace sheep often have dual coats; a soft, short under layer and a hardier, coarser, and longer guard layer. These can be sorted to be processed separately, or spun together. The differing characteristics of each coat allows for very different yarn; the guard hairs can be used for durable outerwear, while the inner coat is what is traditionally used to produce the ultrafine wedding ring shawls across Europe. Spinning them together, like in lopi, produces a unique yarn that combines the strength of the guard hairs with the loft and softness of the undercoat.

Wool that has never been used is known as virgin wool and can be mixed with wool that has been recovered from rags. "Shoddy" is the term for recovered wool that is not matted, while "mungo" comes from felted wool. Extract is recovered chemically from mixed cotton/wool fabrics.

The fleece is shorn in one piece from the sheep. Ideally, the wool is cut as close to the skin as possible to maximise fibre length. Going over the same spot twice produces small fibres that will produce pills in finished fabric, something that skilled shearers are usually able to avoid. This is then skirted to remove the soiled wool from around the legs and anus, graded, and baled. Grading is done on quality as well as length of the fibres. Long wool fibres can be up to 15 in, but anything over 2.5 inches is suitable for combing into worsteds. Fibres less than that form short wool and are described as clothing or carding wool, and are best suited for the jumbled arrangement of woolens.

At the mill the wool is scoured in a detergent to remove grease (the yolk) and impurities. This is done mechanically in the opening machine. Vegetable matter can be removed chemically using sulphuric acid (carbonising). Washing uses a solution of soap and sodium carbonate. The wool is oiled before carding or combing.

- Woollens: Fibre is prepared through carding, which arranged fibres perpendicular to the spun yarn. It can also use noils from the worsted combs, mungo, and shoddy.

==== Worsteds ====
- Combing: Oiled slivers are wound into laps, and placed in the circular comber. The worsted yarn gathers together to form a top. The shorter fibres or noils remain behind and are removed with a knife.
- Angora

=== Silk ===
The processes in silk production are similar to those of cotton but take account that reeled silk is a continuous fibre. The terms used are different.

- Opening bales. Assorting skeins: where silk is sorted by colour, size and quality, scouring: where the silk is washed in water of 40 degrees for 12 hours to remove the natural gum, drying: either by steam heating or centrifuge, softening: by rubbing to remove any remaining hard spots.
- Silk throwing (winding). The skeins are placed on a reel in a frame with many others. The silk is wound onto spools or bobbins.

- Doubling and twisting. The silk is far too fine to be woven, so now it is doubled and twisted to make the warp, known as organzine, and the weft, known as tram. In organzine each single is given a few twists per inch (tpi), and combine with several other singles counter twisted hard at 10 to 14 tpi. In tram the two singles are doubled with each other with a light twist, 3 to 6 tpi. Sewing thread is two tram threads, hard twisted, and machine-twist is made of three hard-twisted tram threads. Tram for the crepe process is twisted at up to 80 tpi to make it 'kick up'.
- Stretching. The thread is tested for consistent size. Any uneven thickness is stretched out. The resulting thread is reeled into containing 500 yd to 2500 yd. The skeins are about 50 inches in loop length.
- Dyeing: the skeins are scoured again, and discoloration removed with a sulphur process. This weakens the silk. The skeins are now tinted or dyed. They are dried and rewound onto bobbins, spools and skeins. Looming, and the weaving process on power looms is the same as with cotton.

- Weaving. The organzine is now warped. This is a similar process to in cotton. Firstly, thirty threads or so are wound onto a warping reel, and then using the warping reels, the threads are beamed. A thick layer of paper is laid between each layer on the beam to stop entangling.

=== Environmental consequences of wool and silk manufacture ===
Both wool and silk require farmland. Whereas silkworms require mulberry leaves, sheep eat grass, clover, herbs and other pasture plants. Sheep, like all ruminants emit CO_{2} via their digestive system. Also, their pastures may sometimes be fertilised which further increases emissions.

== Processing of synthetic fibres ==
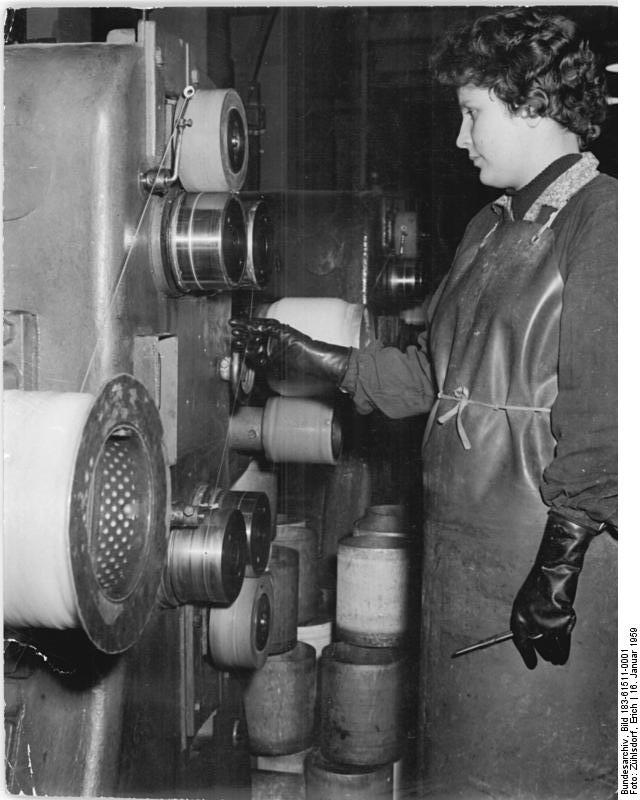
Processing of fibres in East Germany in 1959

Synthetic fibres are the result of extensive development by scientists to improve upon the naturally occurring animal and plant fibres. In general, synthetic fibres are created by forcing, or extruding, fibre forming materials through holes (called spinnerets) into the air, thus forming a thread. Before synthetic fibres were developed, cellulose fibres were made from natural cellulose, which comes from plants.

The first artificial fibre, known as art silk from 1799 onwards, became known as viscose around 1894, and finally rayon in 1924. A similar product known as cellulose acetate was discovered in 1865. Rayon and acetate are both artificial fibres, but not truly synthetic, being made from wood. Although these artificial fibres were discovered in the mid-nineteenth century, successful modern manufacture began much later in the 1930s. Nylon, the first synthetic fibre, made its debut in the United States as a replacement for silk, and was used for parachutes and other military uses.

Unlike natural fibres, produced by plants, animals or insects, synthetic fibres are made from fossil fuels, and thus require no farmland.

== See also ==
- Clothing technology
- Dref Friction Spinning
- Fashion design
- Glossary of textile manufacturing
- Textile from algae
- Textile design
- Timeline of clothing and textiles technology
- Wet processing engineering

== Bibliography ==
- Barfoot, J. R. (1840), The Progress of Cotton, Barfoot's series of coloured lithographs of 1840 depicting the cotton manufacturing process., Spinning the Web, Manchester Libraries: Darton, p. 12
- Collier, Ann M (1970), A Handbook of Textiles, Pergamon Press, p. 258, ISBN 978-0-08-018057-1
- Curtis, H P (1921), "Glossary of Textile Terms", Arthur Roberts Black Book., Manchester: Marsden & Company, Ltd. 1921, archived from the original on 6 October 2011
- Gurr, Duncan; Hunt, Julian (1998), The Cotton Mills of Oldham, Oldham Education & Leisure, ISBN 978-0-902809-46-8, archived from the original on 18 July 2011
- Hills, Richard Leslie (1993), Power from Steam: A History of the Stationary Steam Engine, Cambridge University Press, p. 244, ISBN 978-0-521-45834-4
- Nasmith, Joseph (1894), Recent Cotton Mill Construction and Engineering, John Heywood, Deansgate, Manchester, reprinted Elibron Classics, ISBN 978-1-4021-4558-2
- Roberts, A S (1921), "Arthur Robert's Engine List", Arthur Roberts Black Book., One guy from Barlick-Book Transcription, archived from the original on 23 July 2011
