= Shinjuku Rurikoin Byakurengedo =

- 新宿瑠璃光院 白蓮華堂
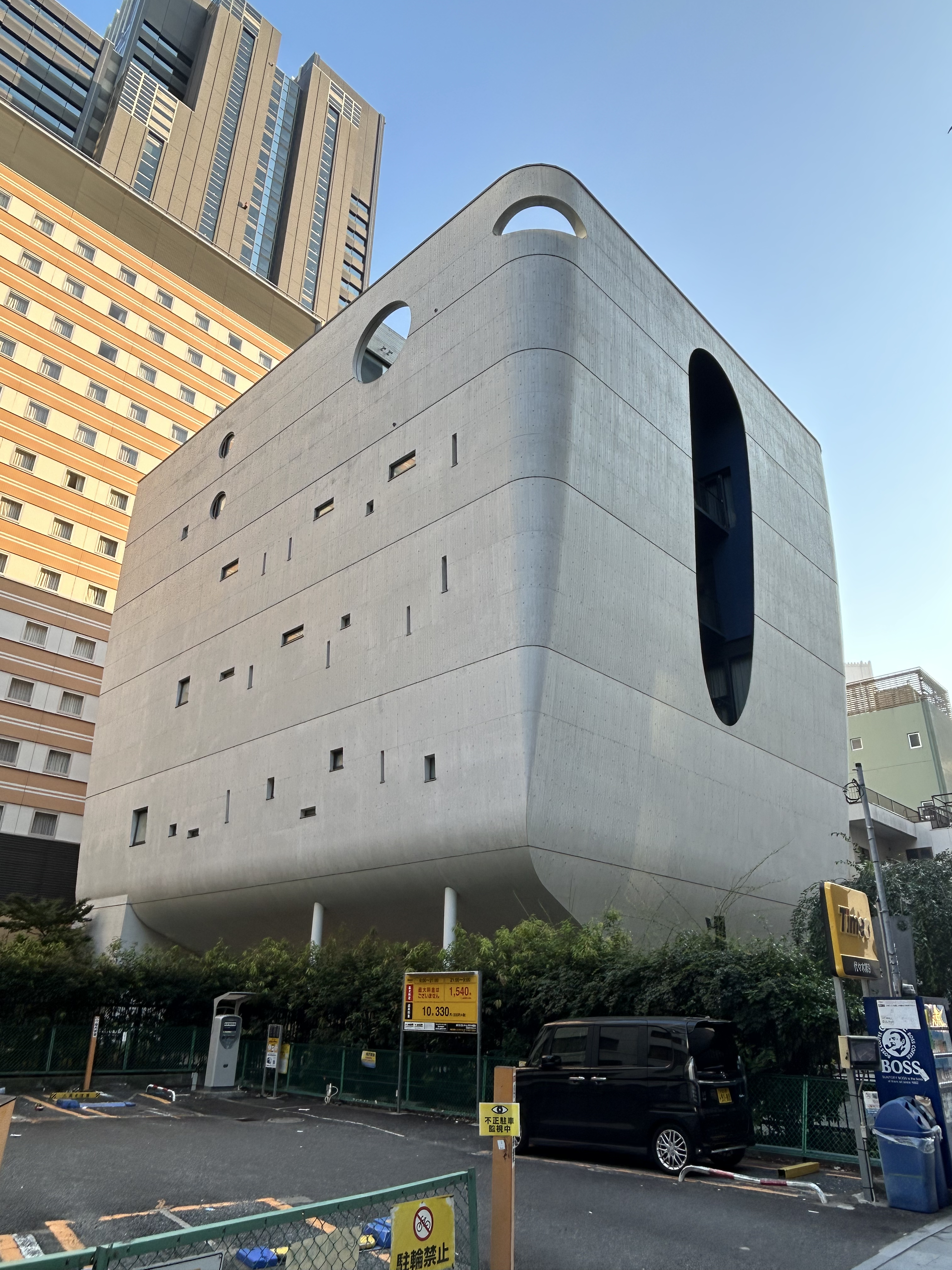
- Interactive map of the Shinjuku Rurikoin Byakurengedo area

General information
- Location: 2 Chome-4-3, Yoyogi, Shibuya, Tokyo 151-0053, Japan
- Coordinates: 35.68747896833613°N 139.69858580674693°E

Design and construction
- Architect: Kiyoshi Takeyama

The Shinjuku Rurikoin Byakurengedo (新宿瑠璃光院 白蓮華堂) is a Buddhist temple in Shinjuku ward of Tokyo, Japan, designed by Japanese architect Kiyoshi Takeyama. Located near Shinjuku Station, the building features a "futuristic" look and uses "advanced technology" to create an automated cemetery experience, housing up to 7,000 urns. It is one of the thousands of Buddhist temples under the Jōdo Shinshū branch of Buddhism and managed by the Komyō-ji Temple of Kyoto.

== Design ==
The Shinjuku Rurikoin Byakurengedo is located just a few minutes by walk from Shinjuku Station, placing it in a busy urban center between many skyscrapers and high-traffic streets. Of its busy location, Takeyama stated: "I wanted to cut this kind of urban context and create a calm and quiet atmosphere protected by the building, with strong form and thick concrete walls. So this temple is lifted up from the ground as if it is floating from its context."

The building's exterior, made of white concrete, has been described as futuristic yet, in a modern manner, evocative of a white lotus flower soon to bloom. It is considered the world's largest building made of such a material. To maintain its minimalist look per Takeyama's characteristic style of cleanness in his architecture, power lines are hidden underground. It was also built with an anti-seismic structure in mind, allowing it to weather earthquakes. According to temple officials, the building is believed to have a lifespan of over three centuries.

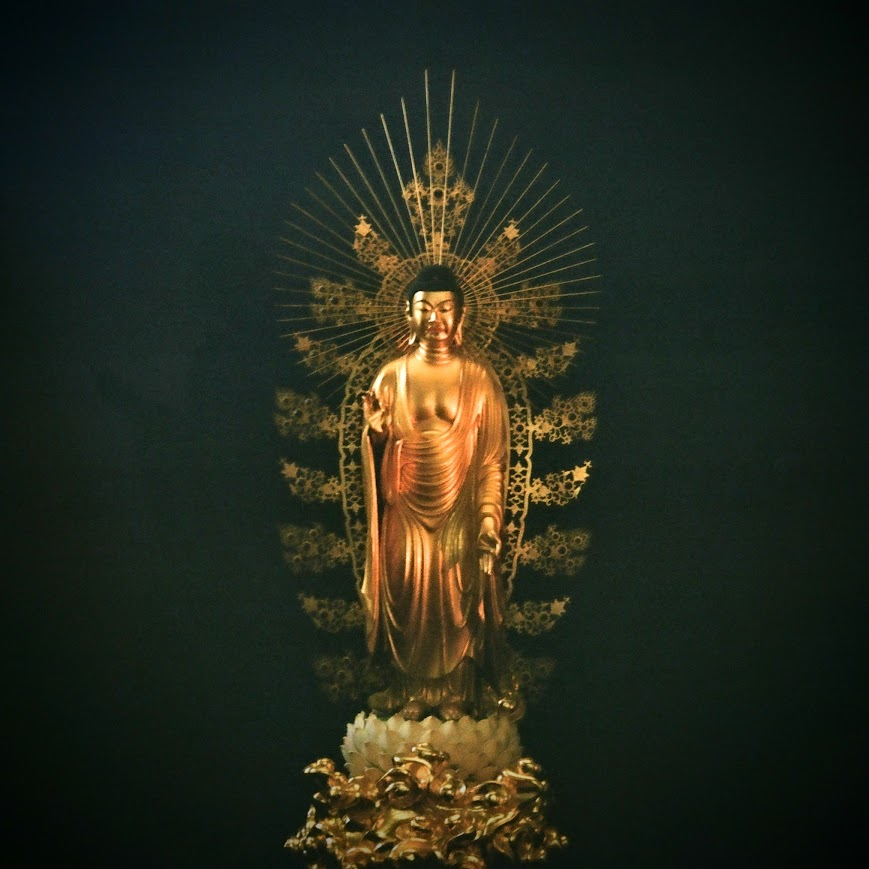
The statue of Buddha located inside Shinjuku Rurikoin Byakurengedo's hall

Inside, the Buddhist temple makes use of technology developed by Toyota Industries. Visitors can make use of electronic ID cards, or IC cards, to locate and reveal gravestones of the deceased via an automated system, after which they can observe their photograph and make offerings. It also has a waterfall and a rooftop garden, as well as a fifth-floor hall where approximately 80 people can be seated for events. Additionally, the building's irregular windows allow for sunlight to shine directly upon its Buddha at 3:00 PM on the spring and fall equinoxes.

== History ==
With a rise in population leading to a sprawl of development across Japan, less and less space has been available for cemeteries which have historically occupied large swathes of land. As such, in the twenty-first century, architects developed vertical cemeteries to meet demand in big cities such as Tokyo, opposing the designs of traditional cemeteries which are more horizontal and open. Japanese photographer Noriko Hayashi then began a project, called Stairway to Heaven, to document such cemeteries which are not only vertically organized but also technologically advanced, as well as cheaper than a traditional burial plot.

The Shinjuku Rurikoin Byakurengedo, as one such futuristic Buddhist temple, was opened in 2014. Of it, Hayashi noted the harmony of tradition and modernity: "The way the monks behave, and even the architecture, is an adaptation of Buddhism philosophy for modern architecture. It was really impressive. It was just quiet and peaceful, clean and warm. The monks were very friendly and welcoming." Many of its users have noted its convenient location and cheaper cost, while others are more hesitant, finding it possibly disrespectful to place urns on a conveyor belt system.
