= Tamaki niime =

Japanese apparel manufacturer

tamaki niime Co., Ltd.
- Type: Limited
- Industry: Apparel
- Founded: 2006; 20 years ago
- Founder: Niime Tamaki
- Headquarters: Nishiwaki-shi, Hyogo, Japan
- Area served: Worldwide
- Products: Shawls, Shirts, Pants, Children's clothes, Bags, Denims
- Owner: Niime Tamaki
- Website: https://www.niime.jp/

tamaki niime Co., Ltd. (有限会社玉木新雌 Yugen-Gaisha tamaki niime) is a Japanese apparel manufacturer of original Banshu-ori fabrics, based in Nishiwaki-shi, Hyogo. Banshu-ori fabric is made in one continuous production process, starting with a yarn to dyeing to sewing process. Popular products include the "Only One" Shawl that Niime Tamaki wove with a belt-type power loom made in 1965.

As of March 2017, their products are sold not only in Japan but also at 200 stores in 15 countries. A shawl produced by the company was also selected as "The Wonder 500" by the Ministry of Economy, Trade and Industry.

== Summary ==
tamaki niime specializes in apparel produced using Banshu-ori fabric. Banshu-ori is a traditional brand of fabric manufactured in the North Harima area of Hyogo. The methods used to weave and dye the fabric are based on a technology brought to Hyogo by ”Miyadaiku” Yasubei Hida from Kyoto around 1800. Weaving and dyeing Banshu-ori was a popular off-season side job of farmers in the Nishiwaki-shi around Kyoto. Traditional Banshu-ori must conform to certain methods and quality standards to be considered authentic.

In 2004 fashion designer Niime Tamaki (originally a from Katsuyama-shi, Fukui) began working with Banshu-ori after a chance meeting with a Banshu-ori craftsman in Tokyo. Tamaki launched her own brand "tamaki niime" in 2004, which produced Banshu-or using both new manufacturing methods and traditional ones. For three years she designed and sold apparel in Osaka, using fabric woven by craftsman in Nishiwaki. In 2006 she decided to expand and established the company "tamaki niime".

The company moved to a store in Nishiwaki-shi, where they continued to weave and dye Banshu-ori. Tamaki started to do weaving in addition to her design activities and learned how to operate the loom. She experimented with the fabric, and developed a soft cloth that was difficult to sew and had the consistency of cotton candy. She wrapped it around her neck and noticed it was very comfortable to wear. This fabric became the “Only One” shawl, which was the main product of the company at the time. It was marketed as “an original shawl loved by everyone regardless of gender, age, or nationality”. The “Only One” shawl is woven using a belt-type power loom made in 1965, which creates a unique pattern and feeling that cannot be replicated using more modern machines.

The company continues to weave this fabric and apparel from it. The factory uses a variety of equipment to support the designing, dyeing, weaving, and sewing processes including a belt-type power loom, a rapier loom, yarn dyeing machine, warper, and CAD/CAM. They also use an arrange winder to create a rainbow-like gradation of multi-colored threads, as well as a state-of-the-art whole garment made by SHIMI SEIKI MFG LTD with the ability to knit without sewing.

tamaki niime make and produce shawls, shirts, pants, children’s clothes, bags and denims. They sell their products wholesale to partner select shops, department stores, and exhibitions all over Japan. Their works are marketed and sold internationally in over 200 stores in 15 countries including the United States, the United Kingdom, Canada, Mexico, New Zealand, and Taiwan.

The vision of tamaki niime is to turn the town of Hie-cho, where they are located, into a cotton town. In 2014 they began cultivating organic cotton on borrowed, abandoned farmland. They also are attempting to boost net domestic production of cotton by purchasing cotton seeds from growers at harvest and distributing them to people so they can also grow cotton. As they look to expand their business, Tamaki does consider issues of mass production, mass consumption, and global environmental impacts. In addition to cultivating cotton they grow vegetables which are used in their café annexed to their factory.

== History ==
- 2004 – In December, Niime Tamaki makes brand “tamaki niime” aiming for new interpretation and development of Banshu-ori.
- 2006 – In April, “tamaki niime co., Ltd” established.
- 2008 – In April, opened directly managed store in Nishiwaki-shi.
- 2009 – In May, Tamaki moved to Nishiwaki-shi, and started development, announcement and production of original shawls.
- 2010 - In April, directly managed store “tamaki niime weaving room & stock room " opened in Nishiwaki-shi. In October, introduced two belt type weaving looms made in 1965. Started making "only one shawl" woven by Tamaki herself.
- 2011 - In May, introduced a Rapier loom made in 1983.
- 2012 – In March, introduced an innovative knitting machine.
- 2014 - In February, started cultivating organic cotton. In August, introduced the Netherlands hand weaving machine "louët" megado ", introduced a circular knitting machine in November.
- 2015 - "Hanayaka Kansai Selection 2016" and "Hyogo Female Future / Hanada Award" received
- 2016 - In September, moved "tamaki niime weaving room & stock room" to the foot of Mt. Okanoyama called "Japan's Navel" in Nishiwaki-shi Hie-town. Opened the newly renovated building which renovated the old dye factory about 5 times the area of the previous Lab. Aiming at "the space where the maker and the customer connect", it is structured so that Lab can be seen from Shop through the glass. On October 3, the Kansai Economic Federation selected Tamaki's "Roots Shawl" as one of ten points of Kansai's special product "Hanayaka Kansai Selection" that they would like to recommend foreigners.
- 2017 – In February, introduced two power looms made by 1967 and a warper. On February 21, exhibited at "Banshu-Ori Messe! 2017" (Minato-ku, Tokyo). In April, started organic cultivation of rice and vegetables. In October, introduced a circular knitting machine and two glass spinning machines. A total of 13 machines are in operation.
- 2018 - In January, newly established about 50 seats of food and drink space on the second floor of at the store and the Lab, offering a body-friendly lunch including organic coffee and locally produced tea, and offering a vegetarian menu called "haragoshirae-kai" on weekend.
