= Toyota Industries =

Japanese machine maker

Toyota Industries Corporation

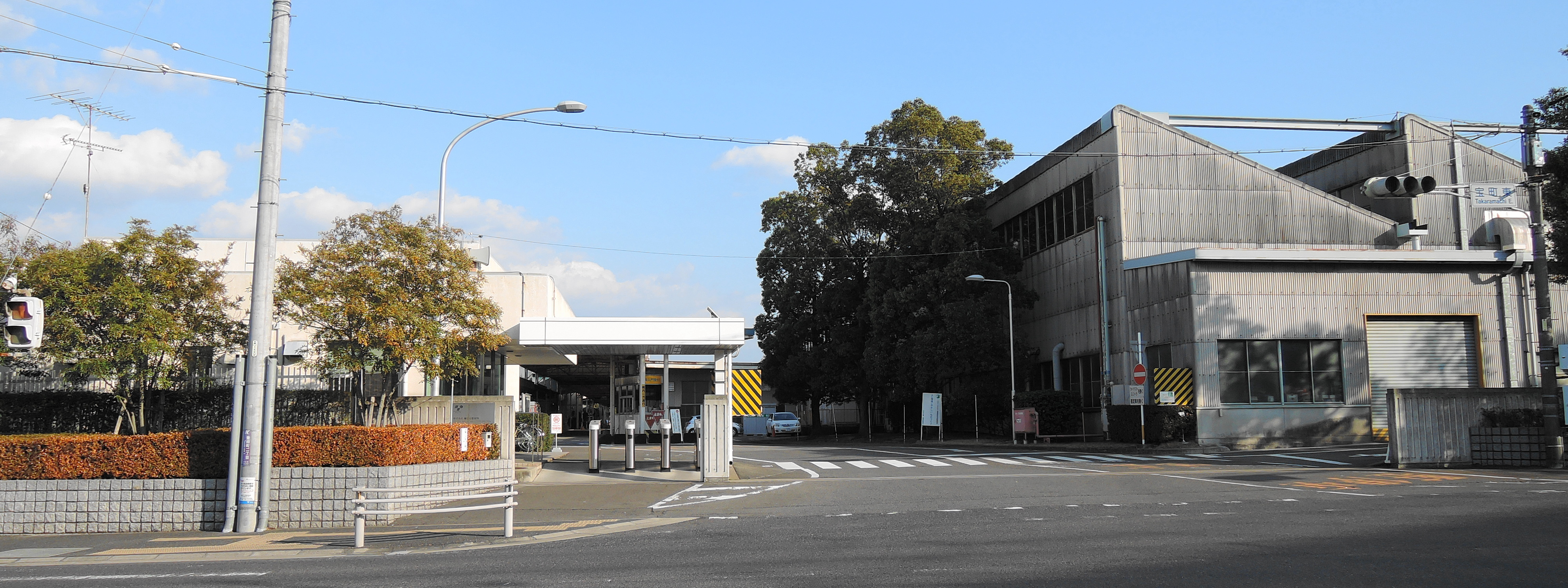
- Headquarters in Toyota City, Kariya
- Native name: 株式会社豊田自動織機
- Romanized name: Kabushiki gaisha Toyota Jidō Shokki
- Formerly: Toyoda Automatic Loom Works Ltd. (1926-2001)
- Type: Subsidiary
- Traded as: TYO: 6201
- Industry: Manufacturing
- Founded: 18 November 1926; 99 years ago
- Founder: Sakichi Toyoda
- Headquarters: Toyota City, Kariya, Aichi Prefecture, Japan
- Key people: Shigeki Terashi (Chairman); Koichi Ito (President)
- Products: textile machinery; materials handling equipment; electronics devices
- Revenue: ▲¥2,214,946 million (as of 03/31/2019)
- Operating income: ▼¥134,684 million (as of 03/31/2019)
- Net income: ▼¥159,778 million (as of 03/31/2019)
- Total assets: ▲¥5,261,174 million (as of 03/31/2019)
- Owner: Toyota Fudosan
- Number of employees: 64,641 (2019)
- Subsidiaries: Aichi Corporation; Tokaiseiki; Toyota Industry (Kunshan); Toyota Industry Automotive Parts (Kunshan); DENSO Corporation (8.72%); Toyota Industries North America; Toyota Material Handling Group; Toyota Industries Europe; Kirloskar Toyota Textile Machinery; Toyota Industries Engine India; Uster Technologies; Bastian Solutions; Vanderlande Corp.; The Raymond Corporation; T-Hive
- Website: toyota-industries.com

Toyota Industries Corporation (Japanese: 株式会社豊田自動織機, Hepburn: Kabushiki gaisha Toyota Jidō Shokki; literally "Stock Company Toyota Automatic Loom") is a Japanese machine maker. Originally, and still actively (as of 2026), a manufacturer of automatic looms, it is the company from which Toyota Motor Corporation developed. It is the world's largest manufacturer of forklift trucks measured by revenues.

== History ==
=== 1920s ===
The company was founded on 18 November 1926 as Toyoda Automatic Loom Works, Ltd. by Sakichi Toyoda, the inventor of a series of manual and machine-powered looms. The most significant of these was the 1924 Toyoda Automatic Loom, Type G, a completely automatic high-speed loom featuring the ability to change shuttles without stopping and dozens of other innovations. At the time it was the world's most advanced loom, delivering a clear improvement in quality and a twenty-fold increase in productivity. In 2007, this machine was registered as item No. 16 in the Mechanical Engineering Heritage of Japan as "a landmark achievement that advanced the global textile industry and laid the foundation for the development of the Toyota Group."

=== 1930s ===
In 1933, the company established its automobile department, led by Kiichiro Toyoda, the eldest son of Sakichi Toyoda. This department was spun off as Toyota Motor Co., Ltd. in 1937 and is now known as Toyota Motor Corporation. Toyota Industries is one of 13 core companies of the Toyota Group. The company owns 9.15% of Toyota Motor and is the largest shareholder (excluding trust revolving funds). As a countermeasure against hostile merger and acquisition attempts, Toyota Motor had held approximately 25% of common stock of its origin Toyota Industries. In 2026, Toyota Fudosan, a real estate and asset management company of the Toyota Group, made Toyota Industries a wholly owned subsidiary.

=== 1940s ===
In 1940, the steel production department of Toyota Industries was spun off as Toyota Steel Works Ltd. (present Aichi Steel Corporation). In 1944, Toyota Industries's Obu plant, which produces castings, began operations. Five years later, the Toyota Industries stock was listed on the Tokyo, Osaka, and Nagoya Stock Exchanges.

=== 1950s ===
In 1952, Toyota Industries began producing press die for automobiles. One year later the Kyowa plant began to assemble automobiles and produce engines. In 1956 Toyota unveiled the Model LA 1-ton lift truck, this was the company's first lift truck model. In 1957, Toyota Industries began producing D-type diesel engines. That same year, it launched the Model LAT .85-ton towing tractor. In the final year of the decade, Toyota Industries began producing the P-type gasoline engine.

=== 1960s ===
In 1960, the Kyowa plant was modified to only assemble lift trucks. That same year, the company began producing the shovel loader and three cylinder crank shaft type compressor. That same year, Toyota Industries' Development Laboratories and Toyota Central Research were established with funds from ten Toyota group companies. In 1964, Toyota Industries was recognized by Japan's Ministry of International trade and industry as one of the first Japanese companies to export. Toyota Industries also unveiled their new automated continuous spinning system. In 1967, the Toyota Publica entered into production at the company's Nagakusa plant. Toyota Industries had a monthly output of more than 1,000 units.

=== 1970s ===
In 1971, the company started assembling the Corolla. In 1973, Toyota Industries reached an output of 3,000 units. One year later, in 1974, production began on car air-conditioning compressors.

=== 1980s ===
In 1980, the company started producing the JA air. By 1984, the engine division of Toyota Industries was separated from the vehicle division. In 1986, Toyota Industries received the Deming Application prize for quality control implementation. In 1988 Toyota Industrial Equipment is created in Indiana, US.

=== 1990s ===
In 1991, Toyota Industries reached the landmark of 5 million units produced. A year later, it set up an Environmental Committee.

== Current business ==
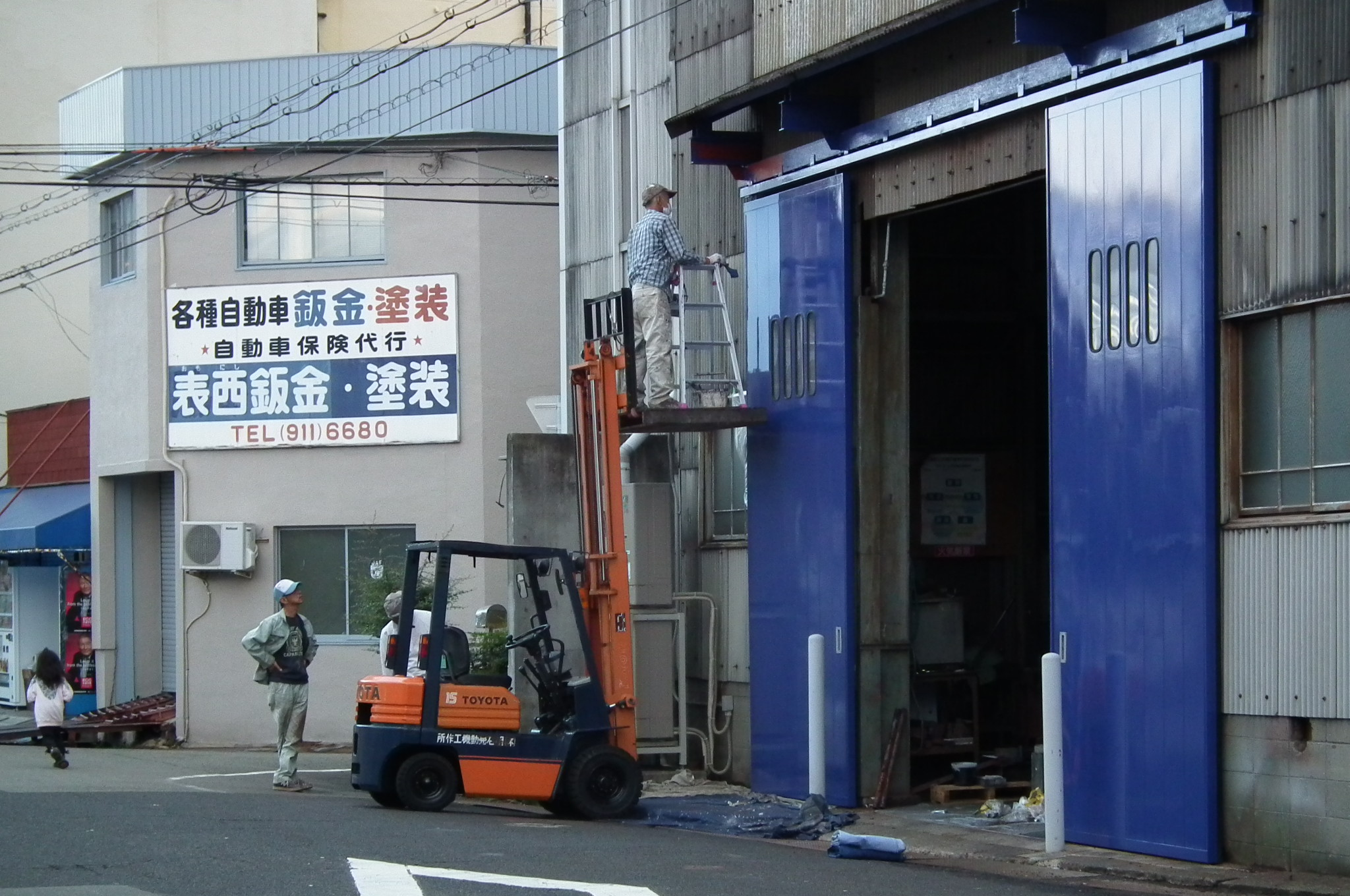
Forklift

Toyota Industries is active in five business areas: automotive, materials handling, electronics, logistics, and textile machinery.

Toyota-branded forklifts from Toyota Industries share the same logo as Toyota automobiles from Toyota Motor Corporation and are manufactured at the Toyota Material Handling Inc. (TMH), previously known as Toyota Industrial Equipment Manufacturing (TIEM), facility in Columbus, Indiana, for the US market.

Toyota Material Handling USA (TMHU) was formally a separate company, breaking out dealer and sales divisions of the North American business. Toyota Industrial Equipment Manufacturing (TIEM) was formally focused on engineering, manufacturing and responsible for the daily production of forklifts. In 2018, these two divisions merged, combining the sales and manufacturing business functions into one business entity, now known as Toyota Material Handling Inc. (TMH).

Toyota Industries Corporation is under contract from Toyota Motor Corporation for the production and assembly of the Toyota RAV4 vehicles. The company manufactures automotive engines for use in Toyota-branded automobiles such as Avensis, Corolla, Crown, and Land Cruiser.

In 2000, Toyota Industries acquired the Swedish-based forklift truck corporation BT Industries, alongside BT's subsidiaries The Raymond Corporation and CESAB. Combined with Toyota Industries' materials handling division, this created the largest forklift company in the world, Toyota Material Handling Corporation.

In October 2012, Toyota Industries acquired Cascade Corp., a maker of attachments for forklifts, for a price of $728 million.

In 2017, Toyota Industries acquired Bastian Solutions, a warehouse automation company, and Vanderlande, a manufacturer of automated material handling equipment, mostly for airports.

In 2021, Toyota Industries formed T-Hive as TICO's solution for autonomous vehicle (AV) software solutions. The newly formed group focuses on warehouse, manufacturing, and airport logistics automation through AV's.

In 2022, Toyota Industries acquired viastore, a provider of intralogistics systems, intralogistics software and supporting services.

=== Looms ===
In 2024, Toyota Industries was manufacturing two state-of-the-art looms: the JAT910 (air-jet loom) and LWT810 (water-jet loom). Both looms operate without shuttles. The water jet loom throws the weft through the warp threads using water, and thus can only be used with synthetic fibers. The air jet loom uses air to throw the weft, and thus can be used with any fiber.

== Stock exchange ==
The company's shares had been traded on the Tokyo Stock Exchange from 1949 until 2026 under symbol 6201.T. In 2026, Toyota Fudosan acquired all the shares of Toyota Industries through a tender offer. The company was delisted from the Tokyo and Nagoya Stock Exchanges in June 2026.

== See also ==
- ST Liquid Crystal Display
- Toyota Industries SC, a football club
- Toyota Industries Shuttles Aichi, a rugby union club
- Toyota Industries Shining Vega, a Japanese women's softball team
