= Air-jet loom =

Textile weaving machine

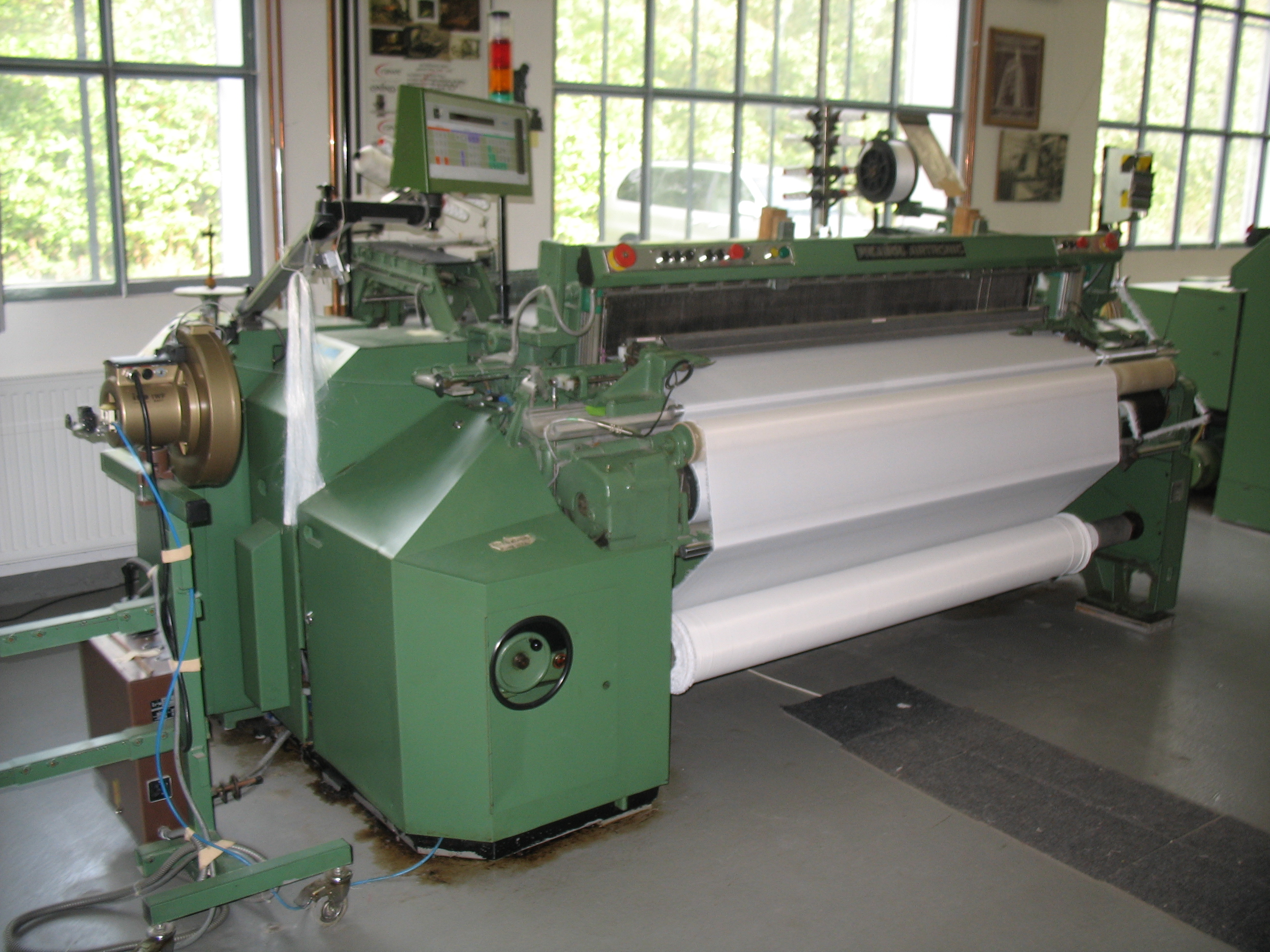
Air jet loom

An air-jet loom is a shuttleless loom that uses a jet of air to propel the weft yarn through the warp shed. It is one of two types of fluid-jet looms, the other being the water-jet loom, which was developed previously. Fluid-jet looms can operate at a faster speed than predecessor looms such as rapier looms, but they are not as common. The machinery used in fluid-jet weaving consists of a main nozzle, auxiliary nozzles or relay nozzles, and a profile reed.

Air-jet looms are capable of producing standard household and apparel fabrics for items such as shirts, denim, sheets, towels, and sports apparel, as well as industrial products such as printed circuit board cloths. Heavier yarns are more suitable for air-jet looms than lighter yarns. Air-jet looms are capable of weaving plaids, as well as dobby and jacquard fabrics.

== Method ==
In an air-jet loom, yarn is pulled from the supply package, and the measuring disc removes a length of yarn of the width of fabric being woven. A clamp holds the yarn and an auxiliary air nozzle forms it into the shape of a hairpin. The main nozzle blows the yarn, the clamp opens, and the yarn is carried through the shed. At the end of the insertion cycle, the clamp closes, the yarn is beaten in and cut, and the shed is closed. The jets are electronically controlled, with an integrated database.

Research has been done to analyze factors that contribute to compressed air use, a major source of energy consumption, in air-jet looms.

== History and production ==
The air-jet loom was invented in Czechoslovakia in the 1950 by Vladimír Svatý and was later refined by Swiss, Dutch, and Japanese companies.

By the 1960s and 1970s, an estimated 100,000 air-jet looms (along with 25,000 water-jet looms) had been produced worldwide, reflecting the growing importance of jet-propelled weft insertion in high-speed weaving.

Companies that produce air-jet looms include Toyota Industries and Tsudakoma, both based in Japan; Picanol, based in Belgium; Dornier, based in Germany; and RIFA (PICKWELL in India), based in China; and Itema, based in Italy.
