= Vanderlande =

Automation company in the Netherlands

Coordinates: 51.603184°N 5.520221°E

Vanderlande Industries B.V.
- Formerly: Machinefabriek Van der Lande N.V.; Rapistan Van der Lande N.V.
- Company type: Subsidiary
- Industry: Material handling; Logistics automation
- Founded: 1949 in Veghel, Netherlands
- Founder: Eddie van der Lande
- Headquarters: Veghel, Netherlands
- Area served: Worldwide
- Key people: Andrew Manship (effective Jan 1 2024) (CEO)
- Products: Warehouse automation; Baggage handling systems; Parcel & postal sorting systems
- Revenue: €2.3 billion (2024)
- Operating income: €107 million (2024)
- Number of employees: 9,104 (2024)
- Parent: Toyota Industries
- Website: www.vanderlande.com

Vanderlande is a material handling and logistics automation company based in Veghel, Netherlands and a subsidiary of Toyota Industries.

== History ==
Eddie van der Lande established Machinefabriek Van der Lande in 1949. The company was based in the Veghel canal and produced unloading equipment including conveyors and cranes for various purposes. In 1963, the company entered into a partnership with the American company Rapistan which, in exchange of a stakeholding, licensed to the Dutch company automated material handling systems. The Van der Lande company was renamed Rapistan Lande. In 1988, the Rapistan Lande company was acquired by the Dutch company leadership and private investors through a management buy-out. In 1989, it adopted the Vanderlande name.

From the late 1980s onwards, airports increased security, especially after the 9/11 attacks, with Vanderlande focusing most of its operations on selling equipment to them.

In March 2017, it was announced that the company would be acquired by the Japanese conglomerate Toyota Industries. Toyota Industries agreed to pay ¥140 billion, almost €1.2 billion at the time. The transaction was completed on May 20, 2017.

In April 2023, Vanderlande announced that Andrew Manship would replace Remo Brunschwiler as chief executive officer, effective January 1, 2024.

== Operations ==
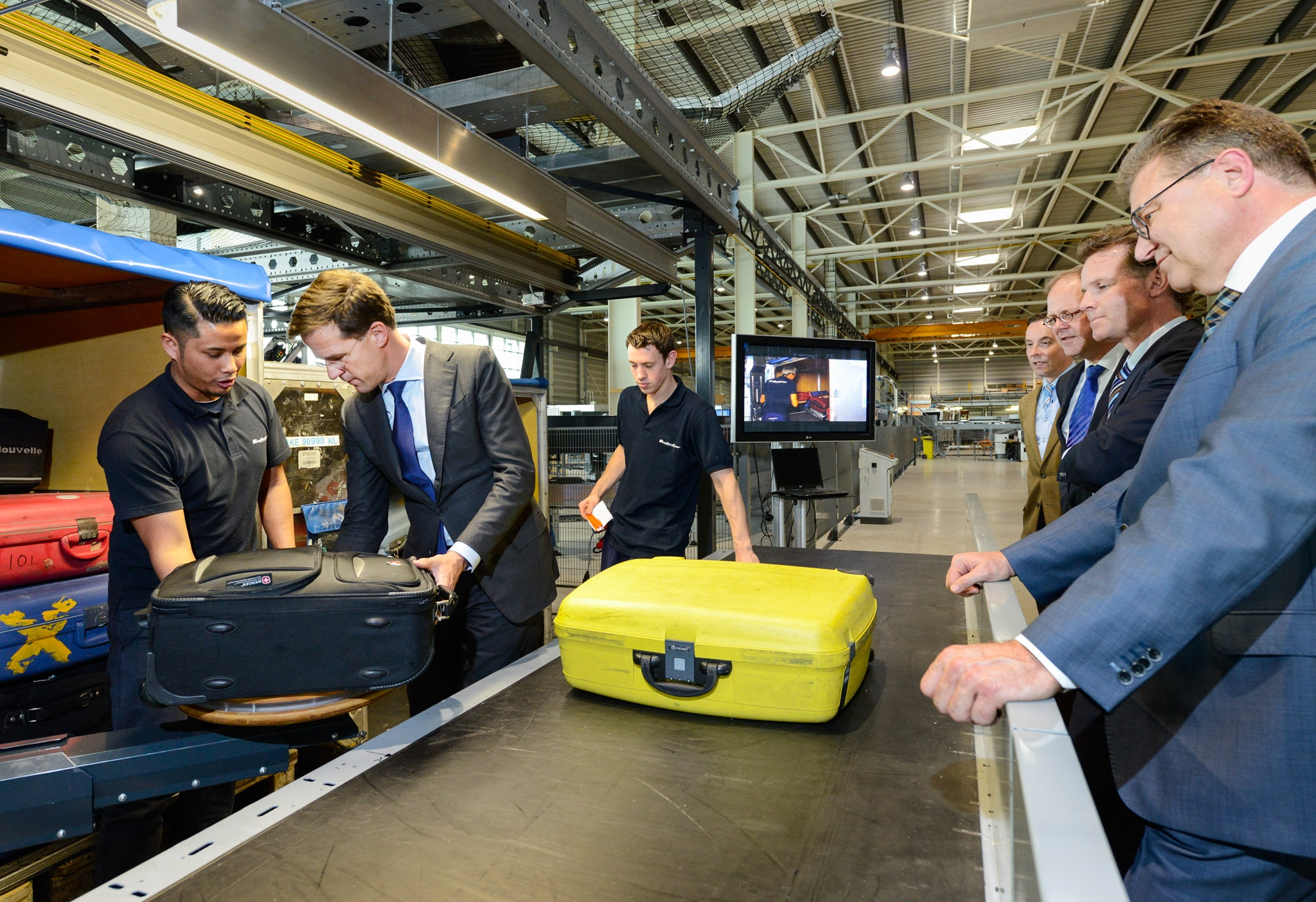
Prime Minister of the Netherlands Mark Rutte visited Vanderlande in 2014, during one of his business trips to the province of North Brabant

In 2022, the company reported revenues of €2.200 billion, making it the world's fourth-largest materials handling systems supplier.

Vanderlande supplies material handling systems for airports, warehousing and the parcel distribution industry. As of 2024, more than 600 airports around the world used Vanderlande's baggage handling systems, including 17 of the 25 largest airports in the world at that time.

Apart from its headquarters and "innovation centre" in Veghel, Vanderlande has additional production and service locations in the Netherlands, Belgium, Germany, France, Spain, the United Kingdom, Australia, Canada, China, India, South Africa, and the United States.
