= Water-jet loom =

Textile weaving machine

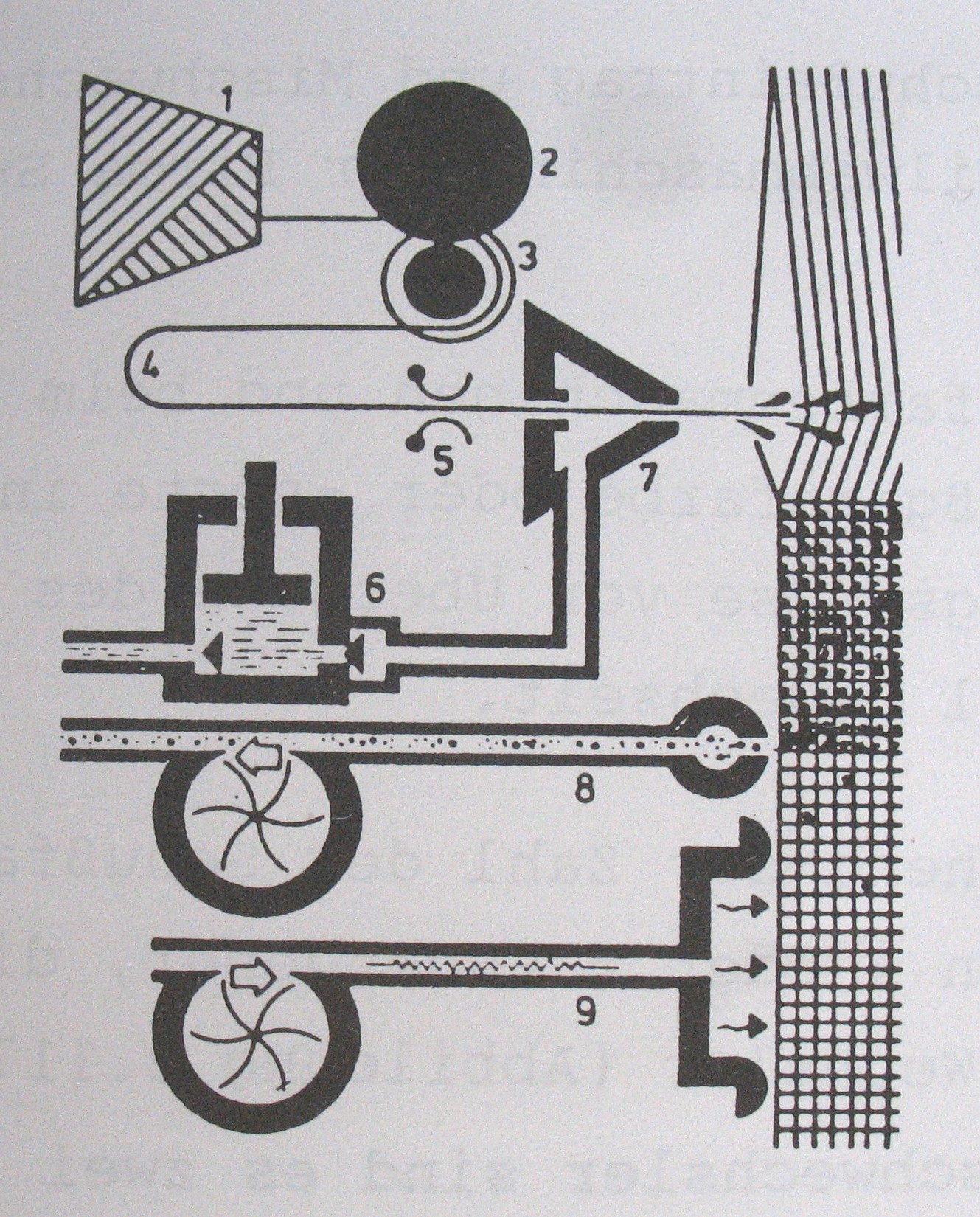
Diagram of water-jet loom operation

A water-jet loom (also written waterjet loom, water jet loom, or hydraulic jet loom) is a type of shuttleless loom in which a high-velocity jet of water is used as the propulsion medium to carry the weft yarn across the warp shed during each pick. Water-jet looms are a subset of fluid-jet weaving machines (the other common type being the air-jet loom) and are chiefly used for high-speed weaving of filament yarns into synthetic textiles; because the process wets the yarn and cloth, it is generally unsuitable for many hydrophilic staple yarns (e.g., untreated cotton) without special sizing and drying steps.

Water-jet looms are valued for their compactness, quiet operation, mechanical simplicity, and freedom from weft vibration.

== History ==
The origins of the water-jet loom trace to postwar Czechoslovakia, where textile engineer Vladimír Svatý (1919–1986) developed the first practical machines using jets of fluid—first air, then water—to insert the weft. Working at the Research Institute of Textile Machines (VÚTS Liberec) in the early 1950s, Svatý sought to eliminate the heavy, reciprocating shuttle that limited loom speed. His experiments demonstrated that a narrow, high-velocity jet of water could carry a filament yarn cleanly through an open shed, enabling much faster operation with fewer moving parts. Over the following decade, he drafted a wide variety of inventions covering both air-jet and water-jet weft insertion systems.

The first operational water-jet loom was completed under the direction of Svatý and publicly demonstrated at the 1955 Brussels exhibition, where it attracted wide attention as the first loom to insert the weft by means of a jet of water rather than a shuttle. By 1959, about 150 water-jet looms based on Svatý's design had been installed at Semily, in northern Czechoslovakia, producing fabrics 41 inches (104 cm) wide at approximately 350 picks per minute. These machines primarily worked with synthetic fibers.

In the following decades, continued refinement of fluid-jet weaving technology led to substantial improvements in nozzle design, pressure regulation, and weft control, resulting in more reliable and continuous operation. The successes of the early Czechoslovak prototypes spurred broader industrial development of both air- and water-jet looms. During the 1960s and 1970s, an estimated 25,000 water-jet looms (and 100,000 air-jet looms) had been produced worldwide, reflecting the growing importance of jet-propelled weft insertion in high-speed weaving.

Throughout the 1970s and 1980s Japanese manufacturers developed and commercialized Svatý's fluid-jet concept into robust, production machines. Tsudakoma introduced their first water-jet loom, the ZW in 1976 and began mass production of the series later in the decade; the company's ZW line has been continually developed and remains a major global product family as of 2025. Nissan operated a water-jet machinery division (Nissan Texsys) before transferring that business to Toyota in 1999. Technical improvements during this time included closed-loop water recirculation, electronic control of weft insertion, and refinements to nozzle and reed geometry, which increased reliability, reduced water consumption, and improved performance. These innovations laid the foundation for the water-jet looms that are still commercially produced in Japan today.

From the 1990s onward, incremental advances continued to improve the efficiency, width, and versatility of water-jet looms. Electronic microcontrollers enabled real-time adjustment of water pressure and timing, while integrated filtration and wastewater treatment systems made large-scale use more environmentally sustainable. Although air-jet looms ultimately surpassed water-jet models in global market share due to broader fiber compatibility, the water-jet loom remains a vital technology for high-volume production of synthetic fabrics, especially in East and South Asia.

== Process ==
In a water-jet loom, the weft insertion process begins when the warp shed is opened by the loom's shedding mechanism, allowing a passage for the weft yarn. A small measured length of yarn is released from the supply package and propelled across the shed by a high-pressure jet of water. The jet is formed by a stainless-steel or ceramic nozzle mounted at the fabric's entry edge. The kinetic energy of the water carries the yarn to the opposite side of the shed, where it is caught by a yarn clamp or sensor. After the pick is completed, the shed closes and the reed beats the newly inserted weft into place against the fell of the cloth.

Modern water-jet looms are equipped with electronically controlled nozzles. Some only utilize a single nozzle while others use two or more nozzles. In multi-nozzle designs, the main nozzle initiates the insertion, while a series of sub-nozzles along the reed guide and sustain the momentum of the yarn as it crosses the warp. Electronic controllers regulate the water pressure and firing sequence according to fabric width and yarn type, ensuring consistent insertion without yarn breaks. A timing system synchronizes the jet with the loom's main shaft rotation so that each pick occurs at the optimal instant in the cycle.

Because water is used as the carrying medium, the process is best suited to hydrophobic, continuous-filament yarns such as polyester, nylon, or polypropylene. Cellulosic and wool fibers absorb water and lose strength or dimensional stability when wet, making them unsuitable for water-jet weaving. The woven fabric emerges with a small amount of residual moisture, which is removed by drying rollers or heaters before winding. Water-jet looms generally require a clean water supply and filtration system to prevent nozzle clogging and to recycle the used water.

Water-jet looms offer several advantages over mechanical looms, including high insertion speed, low noise, reduced vibration, and minimal weft waste. Their main limitations are sensitivity to yarn moisture characteristics and the need for effective water management. In regions with abundant clean water and a focus on synthetic fiber production, they remain a cost-effective solution for producing lightweight, smooth fabrics such as sportswear materials.

== See also ==
- Air-jet loom
- Power loom
- Textile manufacturing
- Rapier loom
- Weaving
