= Viastore Systems =

Logistics company

viastore SYSTEMS GmbH
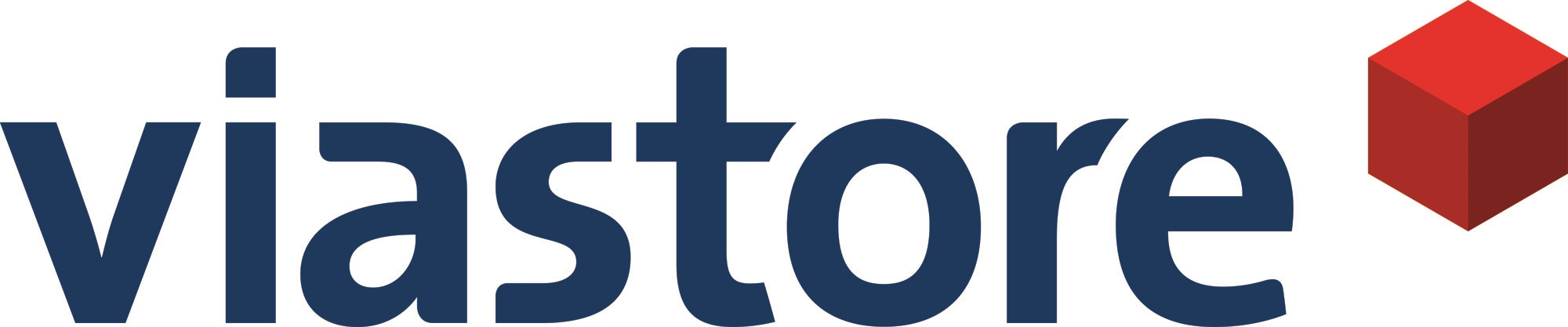
- Industry: Material handling, Software
- Founded: 1988
- Headquarters: Stuttgart, Germany
- Revenue: 130 Mio. Euro (2015)
- Website: Official website

Viastore Systems (styled as viastore SYSTEMS Gmbh) is an international provider of materials handling systems, intralogistics software (Warehouse Management Software) and support services. Under its brand, the company focuses on the planning, implementation and continuous optimization of warehousing systems. Viastore Systems sells turnkey automated intralogistics systems, warehouse management systems, material flow and process controls, shuttle systems, and automated storage and retrieval systems. On 1 July 2015, the Viastore Software GmbH was founded, an own software company that combines all activities related to the warehouse management system Viadat and the SAP logistics solutions of the company. Together Viastore Systems and Viastore Software form the umbrella brand Viastore.

== History ==
The family-owned company, which was originally a manufacturer of scales and cranes, has undergone a major transformation over the past 130 years from metal-cutting manufacturer to digital-tech company. Over five generations it developed from a locksmith's shop and a manufacturer of machinery and equipment to a system integrator and software house. Today, viastore is a provider of systems and software for warehouse management and integrated automated material flows in logistics and industrial production.

== Corporate structure ==
=== Headquarters in Germany ===
- Stuttgart
- Bietigheim (production storage/retrieval machines)
- Löhne
