= Rapier loom =

Shuttleless weaving loom

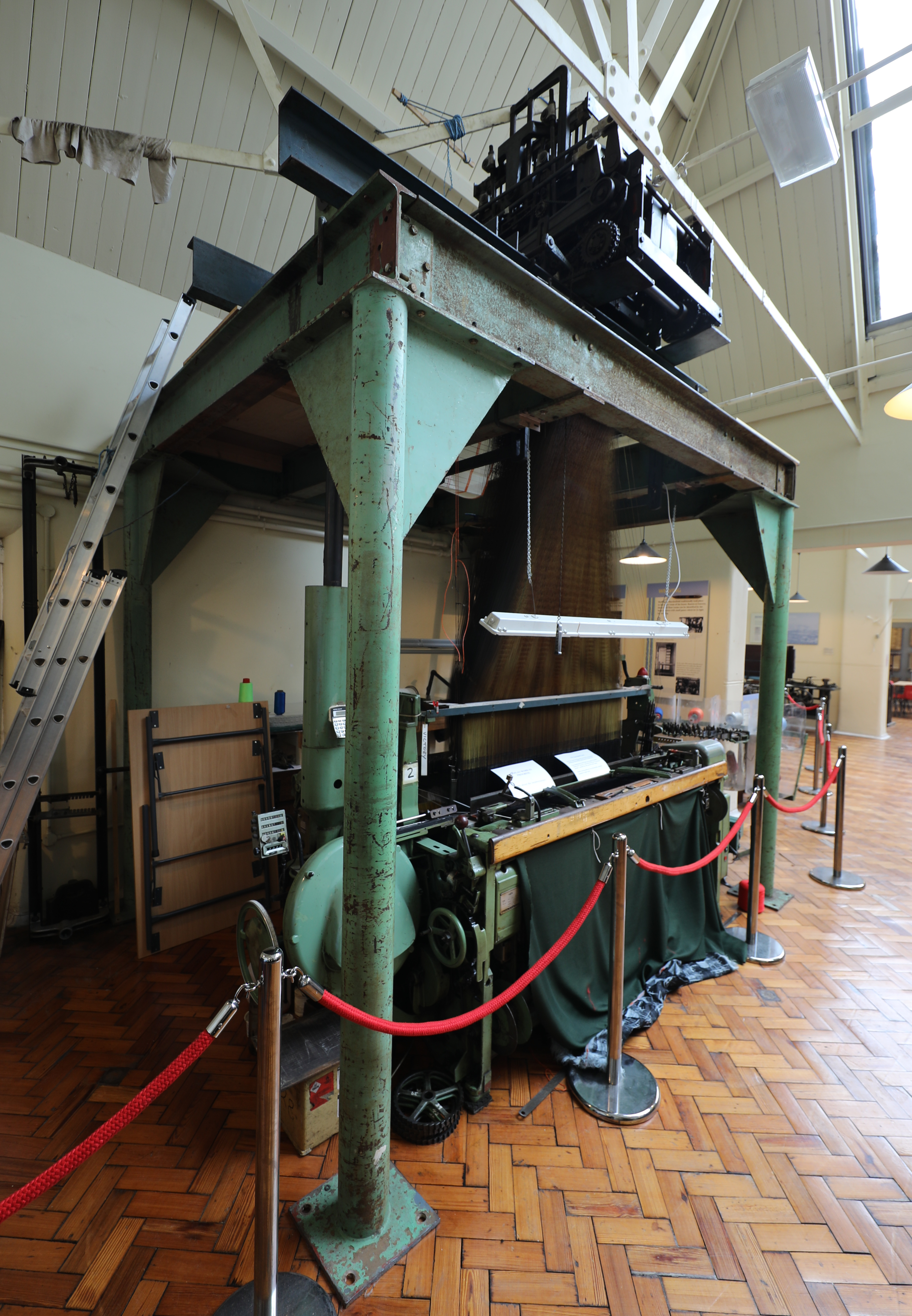
A Ruti Rapier Loom at The Silk Museum, with a Jacquard machine above it

A rapier loom is a shuttleless weaving loom in which the filling yarn is carried through the shed of warp yarns to the other side of the loom by finger-like carriers called rapiers.

A stationary package of yarn is used to supply the weft yarns in the rapier machine. One end of a rapier, a rod or steel tape, carries the weft yarn. The other end of the rapier is connected to the control system. The rapier moves across the width of the fabric, carrying the weft yarn across through the shed to the opposite side. The rapier is then retracted, leaving the new pick in place.

In some versions of the loom, two rapiers are used, each half the width of the fabric in size. One rapier carries the yarn to the center of the shed, where the opposing rapier picks up the yarn and carries it the remainder of the way across the shed. The double rapier is used more frequently than the single rapier due to its increased pick insertion speed and ability to weave wider widths of fabric.

The housing for the rapiers must take up as much space as the width of the machine. To overcome this problem, looms with flexible rapiers have been devised. The flexible rapier can be coiled as it is withdrawn, therefore requiring less storage space. If, however, the rapier is too stiff then it will not coil; if it is too flexible, it will buckle. Rigid and flexible rapier machines operate at speeds ranging from about 200 to 260 ppm, using up to 1,300 meters of weft yarn every minute. They have a noise level similar to that of modern projectile looms. They can produce a wide variety of fabrics ranging from muslin to drapery and upholstery materials.

Newer rapier machines are built with two distinct weaving areas for two separate fabrics. On such machines, one rapier picks up the yarn from the centre, between the two fabrics, and carries it across one weaving area; as it finishes laying that pick, the opposite end of the rapier picks up another yarn from the centre, and the rapier moves in the other direction to lay a pick for the second weaving area, on the other half of the machine.

Rapier machines weave more rapidly than most shuttle machines but more slowly than most other projectile machines. An important advantage of rapier machines is their flexibility, which permits the laying of picks of different colours. They also weave yarns of any type of fiber and can weave fabrics up to 110 inches in width without modification.

== History of the rapier loom ==
The development of the rapier loom began in 1844, when John Smith of Salford was granted a patent on a loom design that eliminated the shuttle typical of earlier models of looms. Subsequent patents were taken out by Phillippe and Maurice in 1855, W.S. Laycock in 1869, and W. Glover in 1874, with rigid rapiers being perfected by O. Hallensleben in 1899. The main breakthrough came in 1922 when John Gabler invented the principle of loop transfer in the middle of the shed. Flexible rapiers of the type used today were proposed in 1925 by the Spanish inventor R. G. Moya, while R. Dewas introduced the idea of grasping the weft at its tip by the giver or a carrier rapier and transferring it to the taker or a receiver in the middle of the shed. It was not until the 1950s and 1960s that rapier weaving became fully commercialized, with loom technology developing rapidly.

== See also ==
- Dobby loom
- Jacquard loom
- Paul Moody
- Northrop Loom
- Textile manufacture during the Industrial Revolution
