= List of fabrics =

Fabrics in this list include fabrics that are woven, braided or knitted from textile fibres.

== A ==
- Aertex
- Alençon lace
- Antique satin
- Argentan lace
- Argentella lace

== B ==
- Bafta cloth
- Baize
- Ballistic nylon
- Barathea
- Barkcloth
- Batik
- Batiste
- Battenberg lace
- Bedford cord
- Bengaline silk
- Beta cloth
- Bobbinet
- Boiled wool
- Bombazine
- Bouclé
- Brilliantine
- Broadcloth
- Brocade
- Broderie Anglaise
- Buckram
- Burano lace
- Buratto lace
- Burlap

== C ==
- Calico
- Cambric
- Camel's hair
- Camlet
- Canvas
- Capilene
- Carrickmacross lace
- Challis
- Chantilly lace
- Char cloth
- Charmeuse
- Charvet
- Cheesecloth
- Chenille
- Chiengora
- Chiffon
- Chino
- Chintz
- Cloqué
- Cloth of gold
- Coolmax
- Cordura
- Corduroy
- Cotton duck
- Crash (fabric)
- Crêpe (textile)
- Crêpe de Chine
- Cretonne
- Crochet

== D ==
- Damask
- Darlexx
- Denim
- Dimity
- Dobby
- Donegal tweed
- Dotted Swiss
- Double cloth
- Dowlas
- Drill
- Drugget
- Duck
- Dupioni silk
- Dungaree
- Dyneema

== E ==
- Eolienne
- Etamine

== F ==
- Faux fur
- Faux leather
- Felt
- Filet/Lacis lace
- Fishnet
- Flannel
- Flannelette
- Foulard
- Fustian

== G ==
- Gabardine
- Gannex
- Gauze
- Gazar
- Georgette
- Ghalamkar
- Gingham
- Gore-Tex
- Grenadine
- Grenfell Cloth
- Grosgrain

== H ==
- Habutai
- Halas lace
- Haircloth
- Harris Tweed
- Hessian
- Herringbone
- Himro
- Hodden
- Holland cloth
- Hollie Point lace
- Houndstooth check

== I ==
- Intarsia
- Interlock Jersey
- Ikat

== J ==
- Jacquard knit
- Jamdani
- Jersey

== K ==
- Knit

== L ==
- Lace
- Lamé
- Lampas
- Lanon
- Lawn cloth
- Leatherette
- Limerick lace
- Linen
- Linsey-woolsey
- Loden
- Longcloth

== M ==
- Mackinaw
- Madapollam
- Madras
- Matelassé
- Melton
- Mesh
- Milliskin
- Mockado
- Moire
- Moleskin
- Monk's cloth
- Moquette
- Mouflon
- Mousseline
- Muslin

== N ==
- Nankeen
- Neoprene
- Net

== O ==
- Oilskin
- Organdy
- Organza
- Osnaburg
- Ottoman
- Oxford

== P ==
- Paduasoy
- Panné velvet
- Peau de Soie
- Percale
- Piqué
- Pleated linen
- Plissé
- Plush
- Point de France lace
- Point de Gaze lace
- Point de Venise lace
- Polar fleece
- Pongee
- Poplin
- Punto in Aria lace

== R ==
- Rakematiz
- Rayadillo
- Rep
- Reticella lace
- Rib knit
- Rinzu
- Ripstop
- Russell cord

== S ==
- Saga Nishiki
- Sailcloth
- Samite
- Sateen
- Satin
- Saye
- Scarlet
- Scrim
- Seersucker
- Serge
- Shantung
- Sharkskin
- Shot silk
- Silnylon
- Songket
- Stockinette
- Stuff
- Suede
- Surah
- Swanskin cloth
- SympaTex

== T ==
- Taffeta
- Tais
- Tambour lace
- Toile
- Tapestry
- Tartan
- Teneriffe lace
- Terrycloth
- Tricot
- Terry velour
- Tulle netting
- Tweed
- Twill

== U ==
- Ultrasuede

== V ==
- Velour
- Velours du Kasaï
- Velvet
- Velveteen
- Venetian Lace
- Ventile
- Vinyl coated polyester (PVC)
- Viyella
- Voile

== W ==
- Wadmal
- Whipcord
- Worsted wool

== Y ==
- Youghal lace

== Z ==
- Zephyr
- Zibeline

== See also ==
- List of textile fibres
- Technical textiles
- Textile
- Textile manufacturing
- History of clothing and textiles
- Category:en:Fabrics at Wiktionary
