= Argentella =

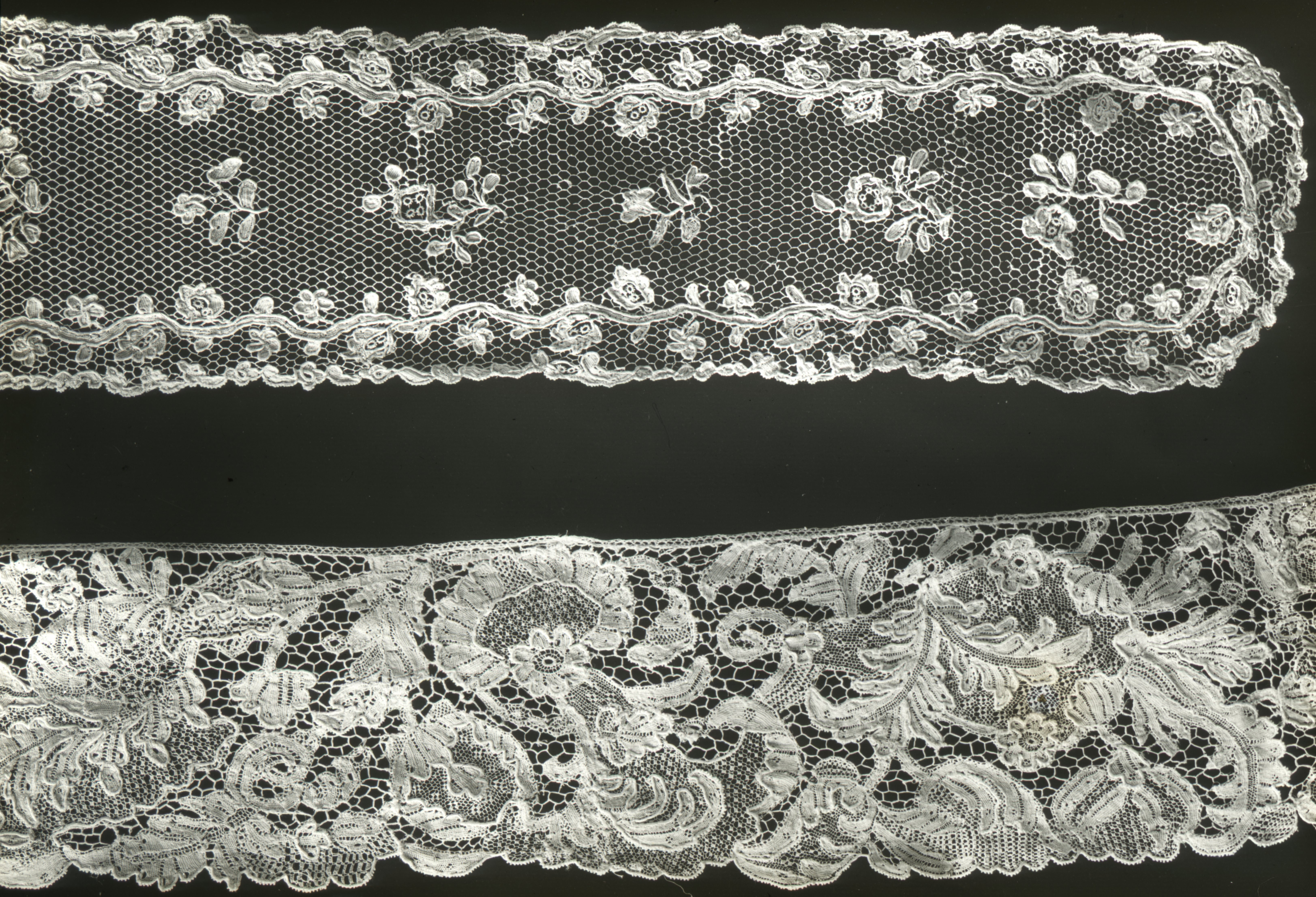
- Argentella and Argentan lace 18th century
- Type: Lace
- Production method: Needle lace
- Production process: Craft production
- Place of origin: Genoa, Italy or France
- Introduced: c. 1700 to 1730

Argentella is a type of needle lace derived from Argentan lace, with a Rosacé ground, a "striking ground of tiny webs." The lace was used for lappets and flounces, examples of which can be found in European museum collections.

Argentella: A French needle lace made also at Abbisola in Italy. Developed from Argentan with Rosacé ground.

Argentella. A name given to a lace made in Genoa [Italy], but worked much like [the French] Point d'Alençon.

argentella lace[:] An early, white needlepoint lace made in Italy. Similar to the Alençon lace, but made with flat cordonnet. The patterns are delicate and spread over a net ground with small dots at the corners.

Argentella. ...a variant of point d'Alençon, which has a large mesh with a six-sided dot in the centre. This dotted réseau is known as fond de neige, and œil de perdrix, also as réseau rosaceé.

== See also ==
- List of fabric names
