= Argentan lace =

18th-century lace from Normandy, France

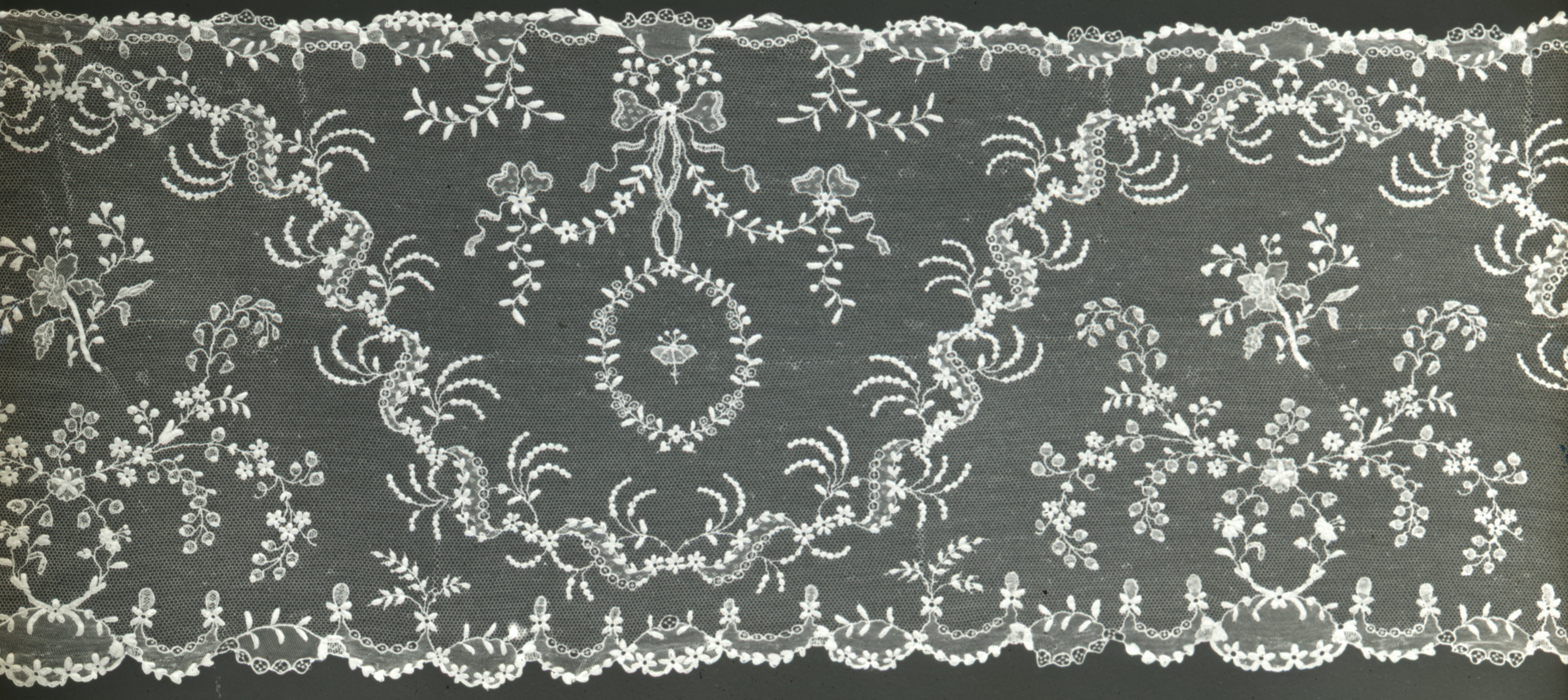
- Type: Lace
- Production method: Needle lace
- Production process: Craft production
- Place of origin: Argentan, France
- Introduced: 18th century

Argentan lace or Point d'Argentan is an 18th-century needle lace from Argentan, Normandy, France. Argentella is derived from Argentan. Argentan lace exhibits a more prominent and larger pattern in contrast to its nearest variant, Alençon lace. A distinctive feature of Argentan point lace is the "bride picotée", which may have originated from early Venetian lace-making techniques.

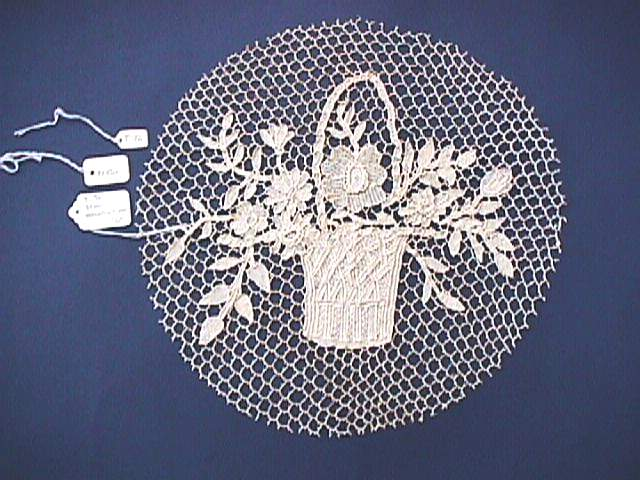
panel copy of Point d'Argentan lace

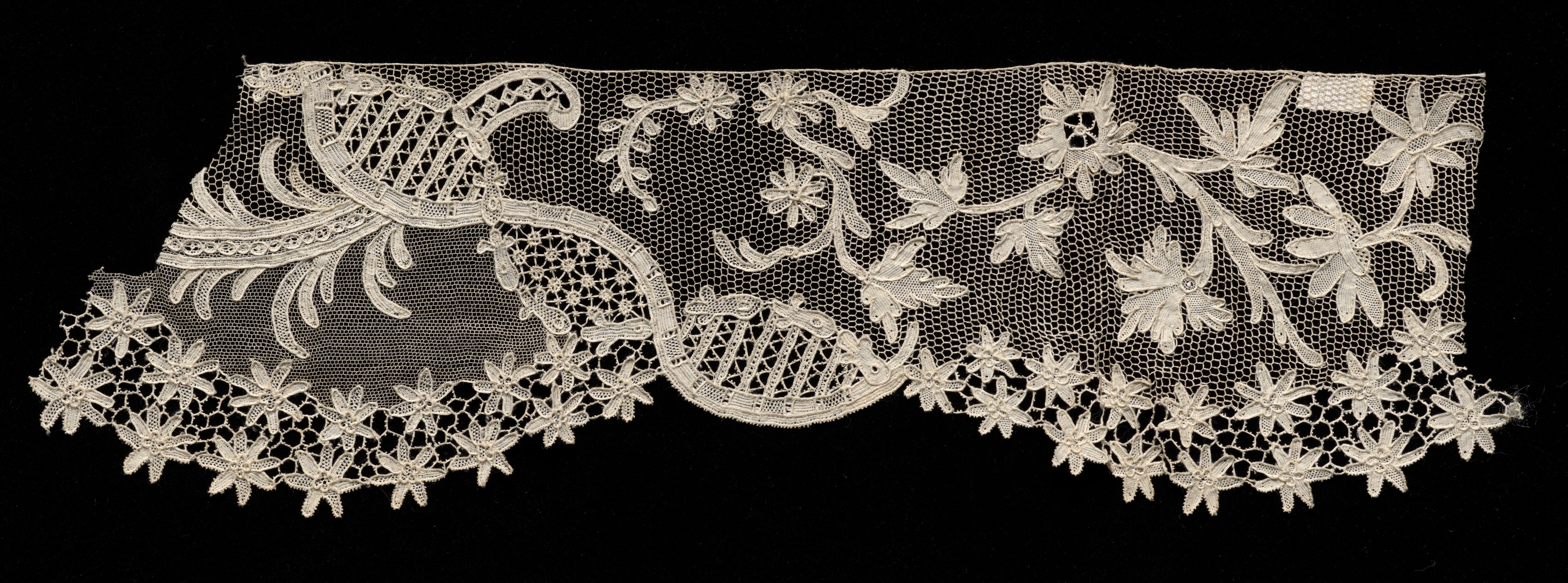
fragment of Venetian Punto Argentan needle lace edging

The Scuola Merletti di Burano produced needle lace inspired by the French Argentan and d’Alençon, but with characteristics of its own and new motifs.

== See also ==
- List of fabric names
