= Bride picotée =

Old technique of lace making

Bride picotée (Breedpee-koh-tay) is an old type of point lace that consists of a large mesh or foundation surrounded by small picots. The lace gets its alternative names, Bride épinglé and Bride boucle, from the use of pins pricked into the parchment pattern to form picots or boucles. The "bride picotée" was a distinctive specialty of Point d'Argentan, which may be a vestige of early Venetian lace-making techniques.

== History ==
Bury Palliser, an English art historian, characterized the "Bride picotee" as a lost art and a forgotten stitching skill. It is the case that the previous female workers had died without having any apprentices. According to her description, this stitch involves a six-sided button-hole bride mesh that was adorned with a fringe of three or four picots or pearls around each side. Several attempts were made to rediscover the technique of Bride Picotée, with one such attempt gaining prominence as a subject in an English novel titled Bride Picotée, written by Margaret Roberts, published in 1883.

=== Contemporary laces ===
Point de France, Bold Patterned Bride Ground Lace, and Bride picotée were contemporaneously produced laces. In January 1874, Lafebure discovered three specimens of point de Argentan in progress of the parchment patterns at Hotel Dieu from Grenier. One of the specimens was a bold pattern with a grand bride ground, which was apparently intended for a man's ruffle. The second specimen had the barette or bride ground of "point de France," while the third one had bride picotee. These discoveries revealed that the descriptions of the lace were created simultaneously at Argentan.

== Associated terms ==
Bride or 'breed' (in French) refers to the loop or string that serves as the connecting thread in all needle laces.

Bridal lace type of lace was composed of Brides (also known as Breed) or bars, which do not include any netting. Bridal lace, which dates back to the Elizabethan era and was made with blue threads, was worn by wedding guests.
