= Mousseline =

Mousseline may refer to:

- Mousseline sauce or Hollandaise sauce
- Mousseline, a type of forcemeat
- Mousseline, a type of fabric
- Mousseline, the French name for Rosie, the younger sister of Caillou.
