= Polyurethane laminate =

Compound fabric

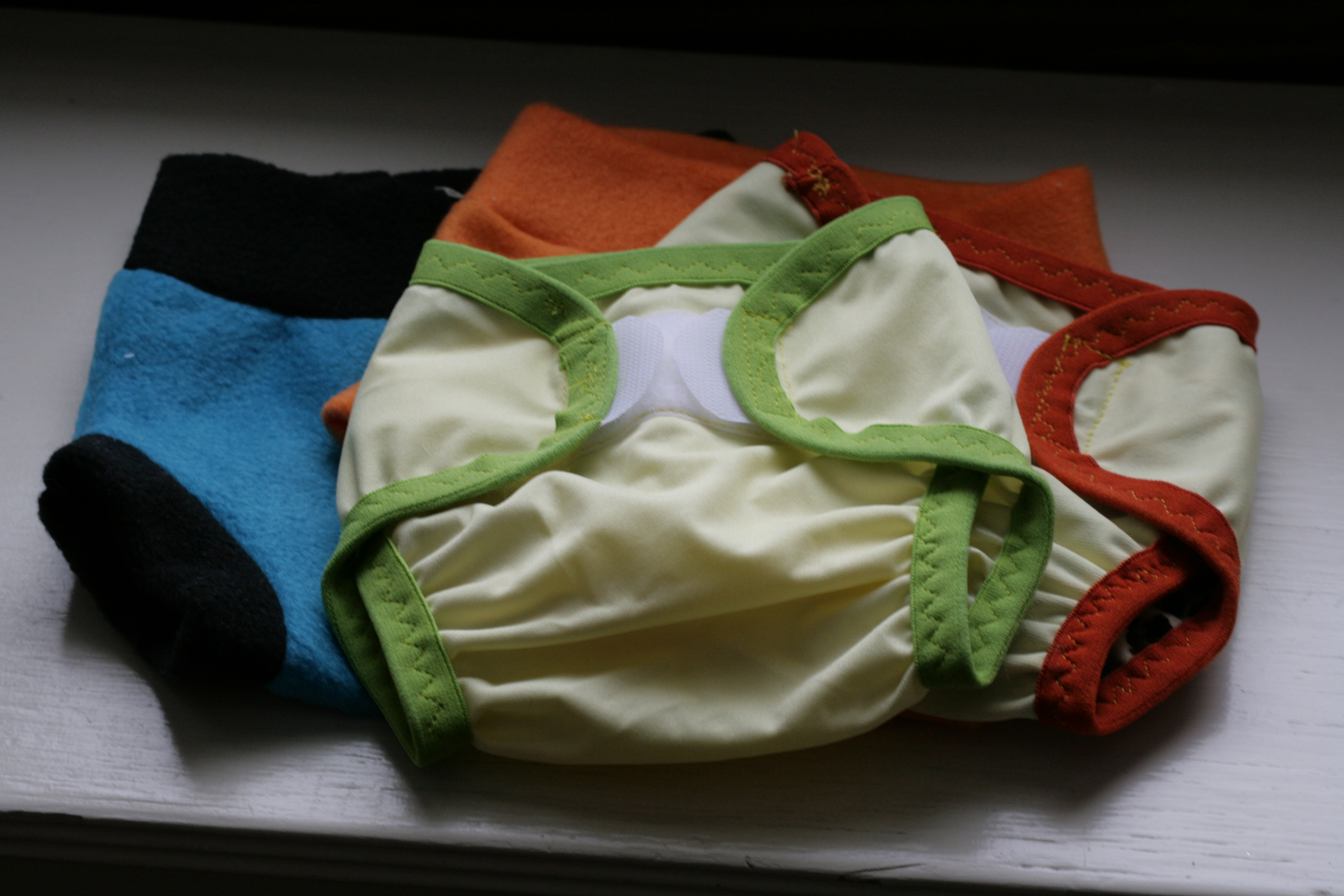
PUL diaper covers

Polyurethane laminate (PUL, thermal stretch, fuzzy rubber) is a compound fabric made by laminating a cloth fabric to one or both sides of a thin film of polyurethane. Polyurethane laminated fabrics have medical, automotive and garment uses.

Most PUL fabric is made by laminating lightweight polyester interlock knit fabric to a 1mm thick film of polyurethane. There are two processes used for lamination: solvent lamination, which fuses the fabric and polyurethane film into a single monolithic fabric, and hot melt, which uses heat-activated glue to adhere the fabrics together. Woven fabric and fleece fabric can also be used, but a stiff fabric will drastically reduce the elasticity of the finished laminate.

== Use ==
PU laminate cloth is waterproof, breathes and stretches somewhat, and can be soft and flexible. It can usually be machine-washed and dried, and cleaned with dilute bleach or alcohol.

PU fabric is used as a wind and/or water barrier in the construction of fluid-splash protecting garments and outerwear clothing. It is used for upholstery, especially in cars and restaurants.

It is used in water sports clothing and equipment. PUL is used for shower curtains, tents, and waterproofing backpacks.

Because it can be readily cleaned and sterilized, PUL is used for medical bedding, mattress protectors, reusable incontinence products, diapers/nappies, wet bags, and cloth menstrual pads.

== Materials and degradability ==
There are many different polyurethane blends and resin types, which vary in durability, resistance to heat, ambient humidity, and light, and the maximum temperature they will stand (some, for medical use, are autoclavable). Resistance is measured by accelerated aging in a harsh controlled environment; the number of weeks survived is expressed as a hydrolysis resistance in units of years (expected under normal conditions). Apart from heat and humidity, bleach, salt, and chlorine can also shorten coating life.

If PUL is kept wet for a long time, it disintegrates into the water and sticks to itself, though it will probably go mouldy first. If the polyurethane starts delaminating from the fabric, it may be possible to relaminate it with care and a hot iron. If the PU coating has decayed, it can be replaced.

== See also ==
- Durable water repellent
- Gore-Tex (brand name PUL)
- SympaTex
- Waterproof fabric
