= Fashion & Lace Museum =

Museum of textile and fashion in Brussels, Belgium

- Musée Mode & Dentelle (French); Mode & Kant Museum (Dutch)
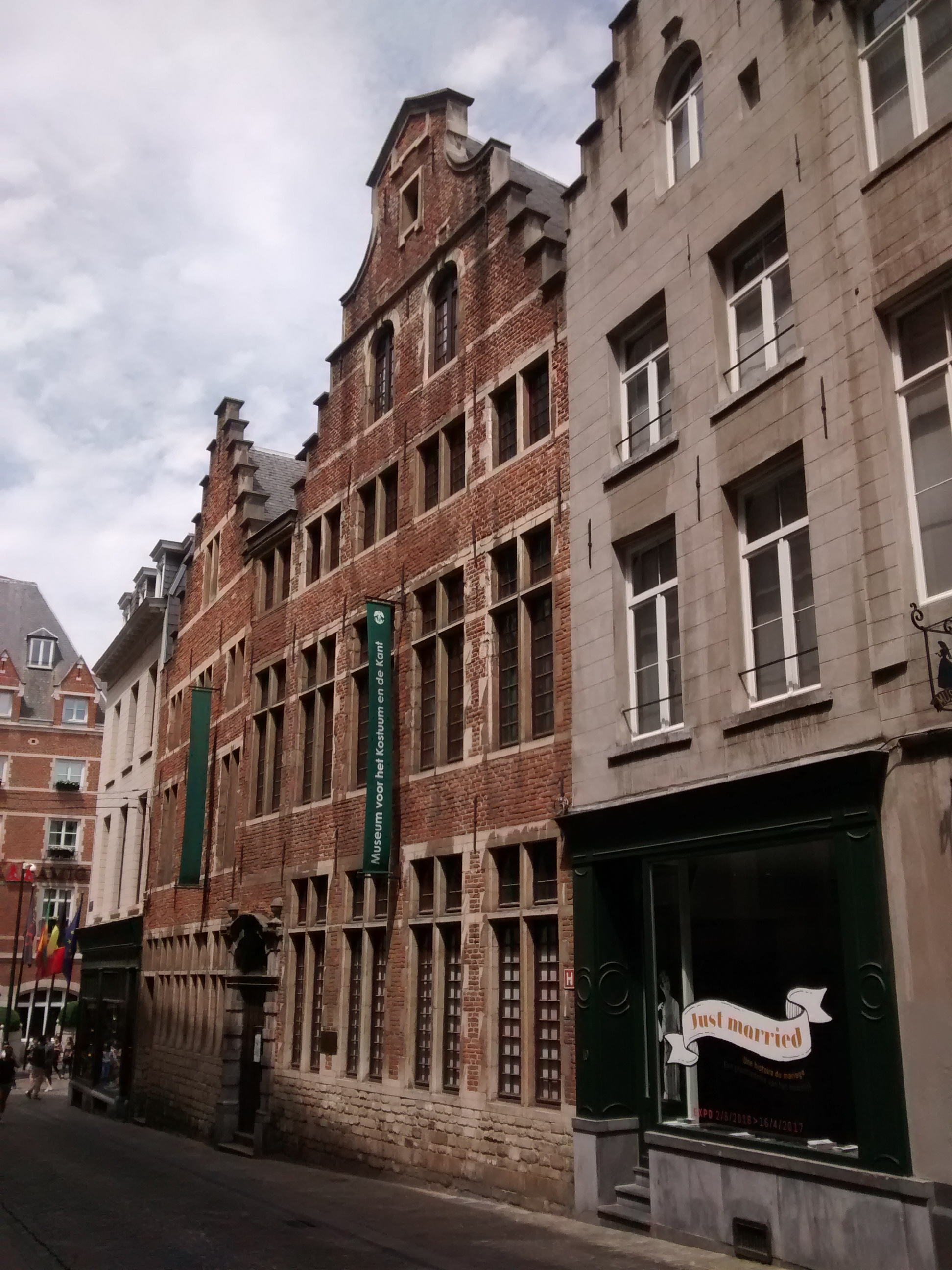
- Exterior of the museum
- Interactive fullscreen map
- Former name: Museum of Costume and Lace
- Established: 1977; 49 years ago
- Location: Rue de la Violette / Violetstraat 12, 1000 City of Brussels, Brussels-Capital Region, Belgium
- Coordinates: 50°50′45″N 4°21′7″E
- Type: Textile, fashion
- Website: www.fashionandlacemuseum.brussels/en

The Fashion & Lace Museum (French: Musée Mode & Dentelle; Dutch: Mode & Kant Museum), formerly known as the Museum of Costume and Lace (French: Musée du Costume et de la Dentelle; Dutch: Museum voor het Kostuum en de Kant), is a textile and fashion museum in central Brussels, Belgium, founded in 1977. The museum collections focus on lace, which has been a traditional craft in Belgium since the 15th century.

== History ==
The museum was founded in 1977 as the Museum of Costume and Lace (French: Musée du Costume et de la Dentelle, Dutch: Museum voor het Kostuum en de Kant). In October 2017, the museum rebranded itself as the Fashion & Lace Museum (French: Musée Mode & Dentelle, Dutch: Mode & Kant Museum) for its 40th anniversary.

== Collections ==
The museum holds collections of antique lace, and items involved in the process of lacemaking. It dedicates a whole room, named "The Lace Room", to exhibiting the history of Brussels lace, a type of bobbin lace made by hand in the city since the 15th century. The production of this lace commercially stopped around the Second World War, as machine made lace took over. It is the only museum in Belgium with a display of Brussels lace. The antique lace exhibitions also feature religious vestments and traditional lace from Mechelen and Bruges.

The museum holds a collection of over 20,000 pieces of fashion, dating from the 16th century to the present day. It rotates these collections every 3–4 months. Permanent fashion exhibits give a broad view of Western fashion trends over the past centuries. The museum also hosts a variety of temporary exhibits based around historical and contemporary fashion. Additional exhibits include items such as Barbie fashion and raincoats.

Since 2020, the museum has been digitising its collection as part of the Inventory of Moveable Heritage of the Brussels-Capital Region.

== See also ==
- List of museums in Brussels
- History of Brussels
- Culture of Belgium
