= Marthe La Perrière =

French inventor (c. 1605–1677)

- Born: 1605; Alencon, Province of Normandy, France
- Died: January 12, 1677 (aged 71–72); Alencon, Province of Normandy, France
- Citizenship: France
- Occupation: Inventor
- Spouse: Michel Mercier
- Parent(s): Suzanne Hourdebourg and Jean Barbot

Marthe La Perrière, born Barbot, was born c.1605 in Alençon, France, where she died on January 12, 1677. She is the inventor of the "point d'Alençon", or Alençon lace.

== Biography ==
Marthe Barbot grew up in Alençon with a sister, Suzanne. Her parents were Jean Barbot, a public prosecutor, and Suzanne Hourdebourg, from whom she likely got her lace-making skills. Marthe married Michel Mercier, sieur de La Perrière, in March 1633, bringing to the marriage 300 livres as earnings from her work with lace before their marriage. They had a son. Her husband died after 12 years of marriage in 1645, and La Perrière remained a widow.

In 1657 and 1658, La Perrière was ill and bedridden. However, she survived to make her most notable contribution - "point d'Alençon."

== Contributions ==
In around 1650, La Perrière introduced an Italian lace technique called points de Venise to Alençon. She fine-tuned her craftsmanship, and around 1660, invented "point de France" that later became "point d'Alençon."

This technique involved using vellum to create the pattern.

In addition to the technique of lace-making, La Perrière also improved the production of lace-making through dividing tasks to different workers, using division of labor. By encouraging workers to specialize in a specific part of the lace-making process, La Perrière increased the quality of the outputted lace.

In 1665, the local lace industry expanded rapidly, during the reign of Louis XIV by Jean-Baptiste Colbert. Colbert established a Royal Workshop in the town to produce lace in the Venetian style, including a monopoly on the production of point de France, which La Perrière had previously produced.

La Perrière continued to secretly make her lace throughout the ten-year monopoly.
