= Caterina Angiola Pieroncini =

17th-century Italian lady-in-waiting

- Education: 18 months direction from Mademoiselle Alée in Paris
- Occupations: Lady-in-waiting, lacemaker
- Years active: 1664-1677
- Employer: Vittoria della Rovere

Caterina Angiola Pieroncini was a 17th-century Italian lace-maker, embroiderer and lady-in-waiting for the Grand Duchess Vittoria della Rovere.

== Career ==
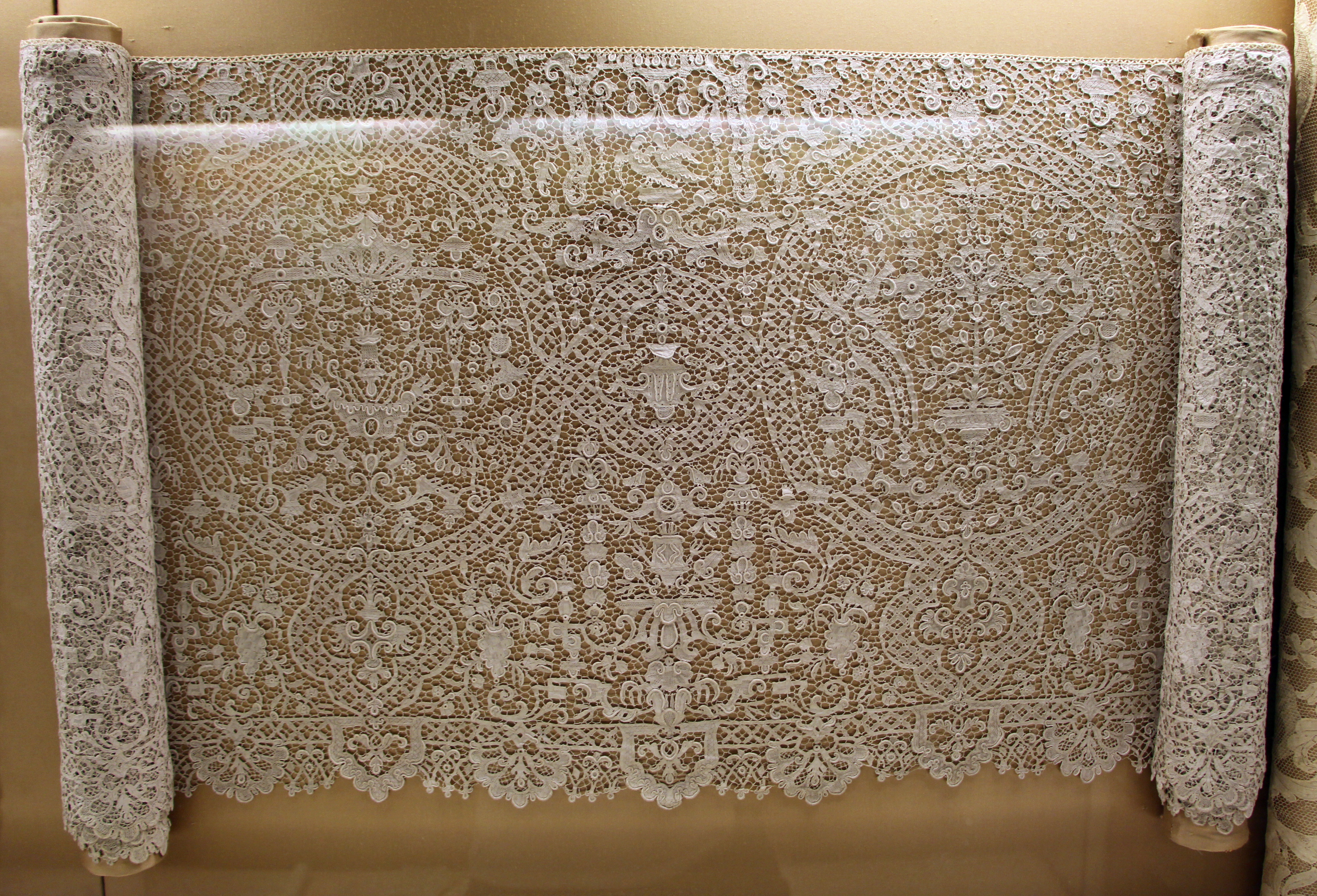
An example of point de France needle lace from the period

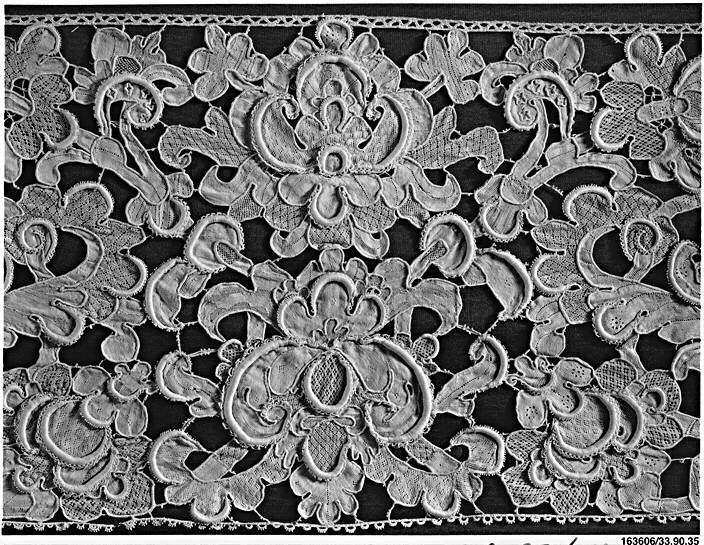
An example of gros point needle lace from the period

As a lady-in-waiting to the Grand Duchess Vittoria della Rovere (1622–1694) who was known for supporting her ladies in waiting, Pieroncini was sent to Paris in 1664 to study needlework in order to make the latest designs, after which she returned to Florence. While in Paris, Maria of Lorraine, the duchess of Switzerland, was her guardian. Pieroncini studied under the direction of Mademoiselle Alée in Paris for eighteen months, during which she was paid 200 lire every two trimesters plus other costs of living.

As a lace-maker, Pieroncini worked during a time when Venetian gros point needle lace was in vogue and was considered the highest quality lace. By the mid-century, French styles of bobbin lace and point de France needle lace became more popular.

== Retirement ==
Following her service to the Grand Duchess, Pieroncini entered the convent on 17 July 1677 and took the name Suor Maria Vittoria during which time she continued to receive support from the Duchess, who lived at the same convent as a child.
