= Brilliantine (fabric) =

Type of fabric

Brilliantine is a lightweight, mixed-fibre fabric popular from the mid-19th century into the early 20th century.

== Overview ==
Brilliantine can be plain or twill woven with a wool or mohair weft on a silk or cotton warp.

Brilliantine has a lustrous finish and is known for its dust-shedding properties; it was available in solid colors or printed, and was used for dresses, dusters, and linings.

== See also ==
- Crash (fabric)
- Chiffon (fabric)
- Charvet (fabric)
- Bayadere (fabric)
- Dungaree (fabric)
- Georgette (fabric)
