= Milliskin =

Type of fabric

Milliskin is a type of fabric commonly used to make tights and dance leotards. It was used to make the Superman costume in the movie Superman Returns (2006).

Milliskin is characterized by being very light, thin, and stretchy.
