= Poplin =

Strong, plain-weave fabric with a fine cross-rib

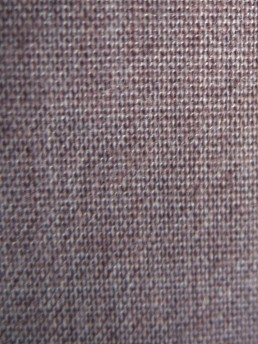
Poplin

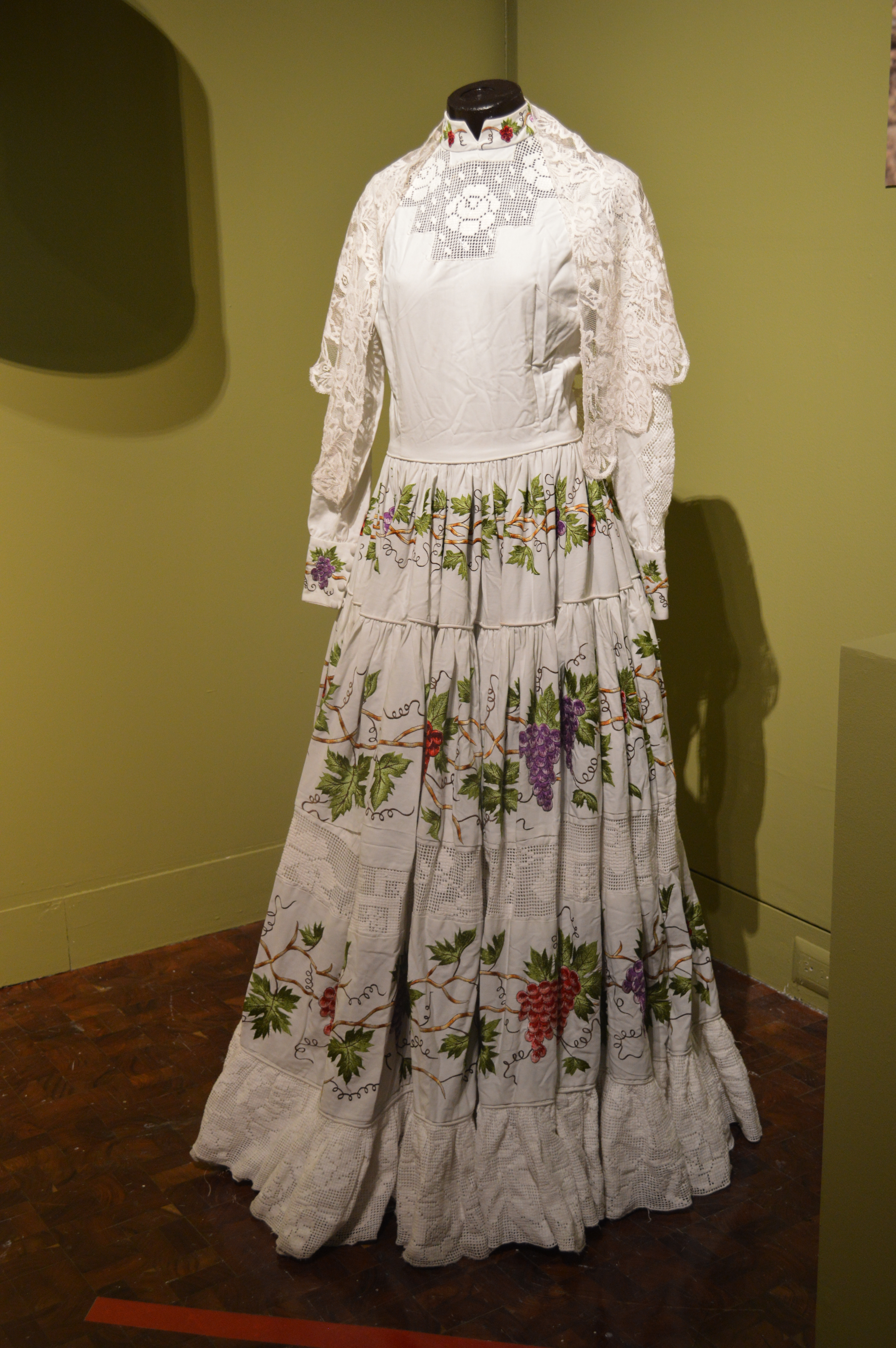
Poplin dress embroidered with grape vines from Aguascalientes at the Museo de Arte Popular in Mexico City

Poplin, also called tabinet (or tabbinet), is a fine (but thick) wool, cotton or silk fabric with crosswise ribs that typically give a corded surface. Nowadays, the name refers to a strong material in a plain weave of any fiber or blend.

Poplin traditionally consisted of a silk warp with a weft of worsted yarn. In this case, as the weft is in the form of a stout cord, the fabric has a ridged structure, like rep, which gives depth and softness to the lustre of the silky surface. The ribs run across the fabric from selvedge to selvedge. In Britain, woollen yarn from the spinners in Suffolk would be sent to Dublin to be woven with silk into tabinet.

Poplin is now made with wool, cotton, silk, rayon, polyester or a mixture of these. Since it has a plain under/over weave, the fabric displays a plain woven surface with no ribbing if the weft and warp threads are of the same material and size. Shirts made from this material are easy to iron and do not wrinkle easily.

Poplins are used for dress purposes, and for rich upholstery work which are formed by using coarse filling-yarns in a plain/hard weave.

The term "poplin" allegedly originates from papelino, a fabric made at Avignon, France, in the 15th century, and named for the papal (pope's) residence there, and from the French papeline (a fabric, normally made with silk, of the same period). An alternative derivation associates "poplin" with products of the cloth industry of Poperinge in Flanders in present-day Belgium.

The most common usage of poplin until about the 20th century was to make silk, cotton or heavy-weight wool dresses, suitable for winter wear.

In the early 1920s, British-made cotton poplin was introduced to the United States, but the American market thought that the name had connotations of heaviness and arbitrarily renamed it "broadcloth", a name that persists for a cotton or polyester-cotton blend fabric used for shirting. In Europe, "broadcloth" typically describes a densely-woven woolen fabric with a smooth finish.

== See also ==
- Eolienne
