= Swanskin cloth =

Woven textile

Swanskin is a close woven twill-weave flannel cloth for work clothes. It was used by fishermen and laborers. It is employed also as Ironing cloth to support on ironing tables.

== History ==
In the 17th century, the cloth industry was an important part of Shaftesbury and Sturminster Newton's economy, with production taking place in cottage industries in the surrounding areas. In the 18th century, the towns and Blackmore Vale area produced a coarse white woollen cloth known as 'swanskin,' that was used by Newfoundland fishers and for British Army and Navy uniforms. Local watermills became fulling mills for cleaning the raw wool, and teasels were used for napping the cloth.

Original 18th century samples of the fabric were thought to be lost until 2022, when a team of British-Canadian students found woollen swanskin mittens on the Change Islands. These can be found at the Olde Shoppe Museum on the islands. Further information on Dorset's role in the swanskin trade can be found at the Sturminster Newton Museum.

== Swanskin ==
Some sources (Fairchild's dictionary of textiles) define "swanskin" as a generic term for soft, napped fabrics of the time period.

== See also ==
- Textile
- Woolen
