= Paduasoy =

Luxurious strong corded silk fabric of the 17th and 18th centuries

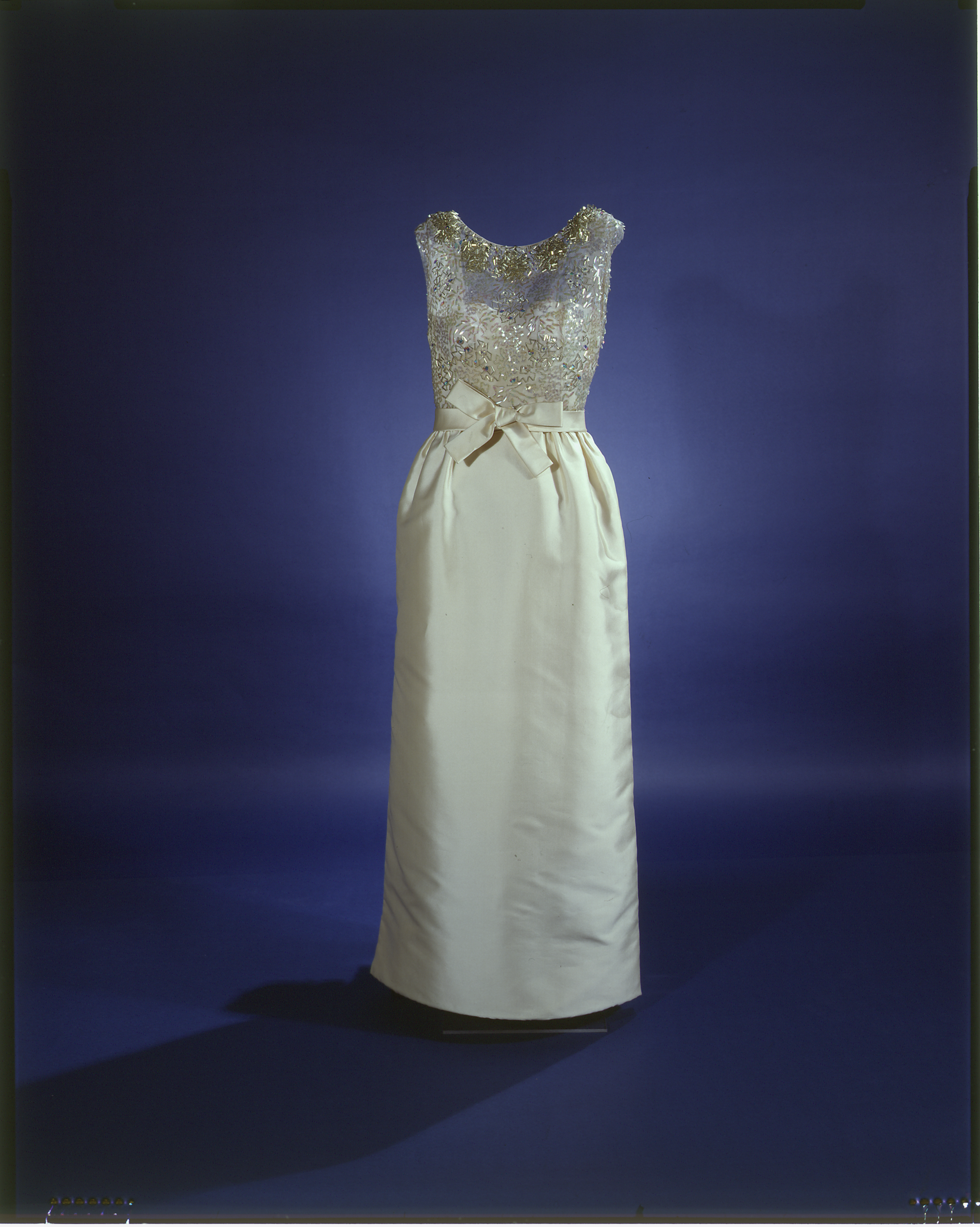
Evening gown made of peau de soie, worn by Lady Bird Johnson.

Paduasoy or padesoy (/ˈpædjuəsɔɪ/; French: peau de soie) is a luxurious strong corded or grosgrain silk textile that originated in Early Modern Europe. The term paduasoy first appeared in English in 1663.

Paduasoy silk was woven in a variation of the satin weave, with bindings arranged to create fine cross-ridges across the fabric.

== History ==
In the British East India Company supercargoes' records, examined by Leanna Lee-Whitman, paduasoy made its first appearance in 1736. Its fine appearance is endorsed in a letter to Benjamin Franklin in London from his wife, in 1765: "The chairs are plain horsehair and look as well as Paduasoy."

In the British East India records consulted by Leanna Lee-Whitman, black paduasoys completely supplanted "plain" ones after 1761: George Washington commissioned a friend, Tench Tilghman, to purchase numerous household items, "if great bargains are to be had", from the cargo of a ship in the China trade that had docked at Baltimore and were to be auctioned in October 1785. Among his requests, if they could be had cheaply, were "About 13 yds of good bla: paduasoy".

== In literature ==
Beatrix Potter employed paduasoy to set the old-fashioned scene in The Tailor of Gloucester, which begins, "In the time of swords and periwigs and full-skirted coats with flowered lappets—when gentlemen wore ruffles, and gold-laced waistcoats of paduasoy and taffeta—there lived a tailor in Gloucester."

In Elizabeth Gaskell's Cranford (1851), an old white paduasoy wedding dress longed for by Miss Matty's mother has been recut into a christening cloak for a baby.
