= Youghal lace =

Needle lace developed in Youghal, Ireland

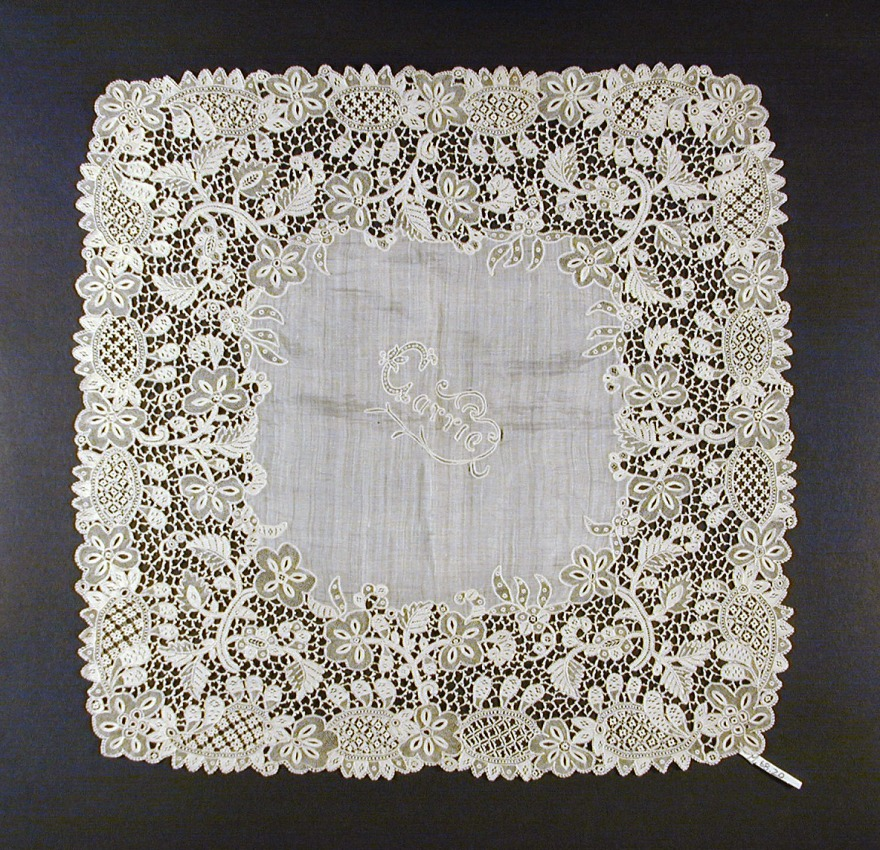
- Wedding handkerchief of linen trimmed with Youghal lace
- Type: Lace
- Production method: Needle lace
- Production process: Craft production
- Place of origin: Youghal, Ireland.
- Introduced: 1845

Youghal lace (or Point d'Irlande) is a needle lace inspired by Italian needle lace and developed in Youghal, County Cork, Ireland.

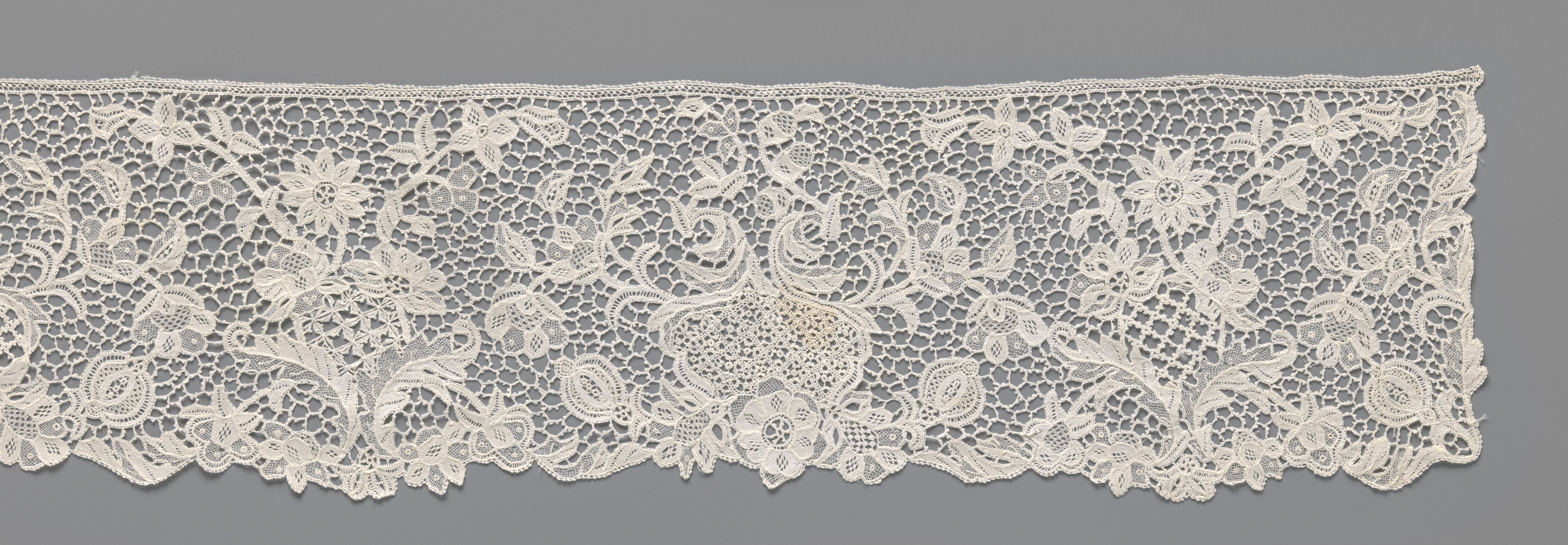
Youghal lace with floral motifs

== Origins ==
Youghal Lace was perhaps the most successful of the nineteenth century Irish needlelaces. In 1845 Mother Mary Ann Smith (d.1872), one of the Presentation Sisters, unpicked some Italian lace to discover the techniques used to make it, and then taught them to local women. The Convent Lace School was opened in Youghal in 1852. Youghal lace was made to a high standard and employed a wide variety of motifs. It was therefore able to survive as a commercial product until the First World War, which saw the general demise of handmade lacemaking.

== Characteristics ==
Youghal Lace is considered a true lace as it is created with a sewing needle and thread only. It was created in Youghal and Kenmare. It was mostly used for fans, collars, cuffs and ecclesiastical trimmings. It is a flat needlepoint lace with no cordon nets. It uses a ladder like buttonhole stitches around each motif and edges decorated with a 'Venetian Stitch' or knotted border. The designs are primarily of flowers such as roses, anemones and fuchsia, with spiky shaped leaves. The shading of the petals are a result of the closeness of the buttonhole stitches. There were at least fifty distinct stitches associated with Youghal Lace.

== Legacy ==
Among the finest pieces of lace made in Youghal was a train for Queen Mary worn on her visit to India in 1911. The skill of lace making is still retained in Youghal to this day. There is no written record of either the stitches or the general technique at the Convents themselves. In 1863, a shawl of Youghal Lace was given to Alexandra of Denmark on her wedding. In 1888, a Rocket and Altar trimming created in Youghal for the Bishops of Ireland as a gift to Pope Leo XIII was awarded a gold medal at the Vatican Exhibition.

The following are known work relating to Youghal Lace in collections:

- A sampler of 43 stitches (in Kenmare Lace, similar to Youghal Lace), on display at the Kenmare Lace and Design Centre in Kenmare. (Note: The designs in Kenmare are examples of lace designs. None of them were drawn in youghal by the Presentation sisters there.)
- A court train made for Queen Mary and worn by her at the Delhi Durbar of 1911.
- A number of smaller pieces are available for viewing at Youghal Heritage Centre.
- A 1906, Youghal Lace collar is at National Museum of Ireland – Decorative Arts and History.
- Two books of designs drawn in Chinese white on paper tinted beige, pink, azure, crimson or midnight blue.
- The Needlecraft Practical Journal no.106, published by William Briggs under the Penelope trademark, c. 1909.
- Two books of designs for needlepoint lace, hand-painted by the nuns of St Clares Convent in the late 19th century, on display at the Kenmare Lace and Design Centre, Kenmare.

Pat Earnshaw has written two books, Youghal and other Irish Lace and Youghal Lace, the craft and the cream. The identification of sections for replicating the historical Kenmare sampler are provided and working diagrams of the presumed stitches enable contemporary lacemakers to practice this craft today.
