= Point de France =

Type of needle lace developed in the late 17th century

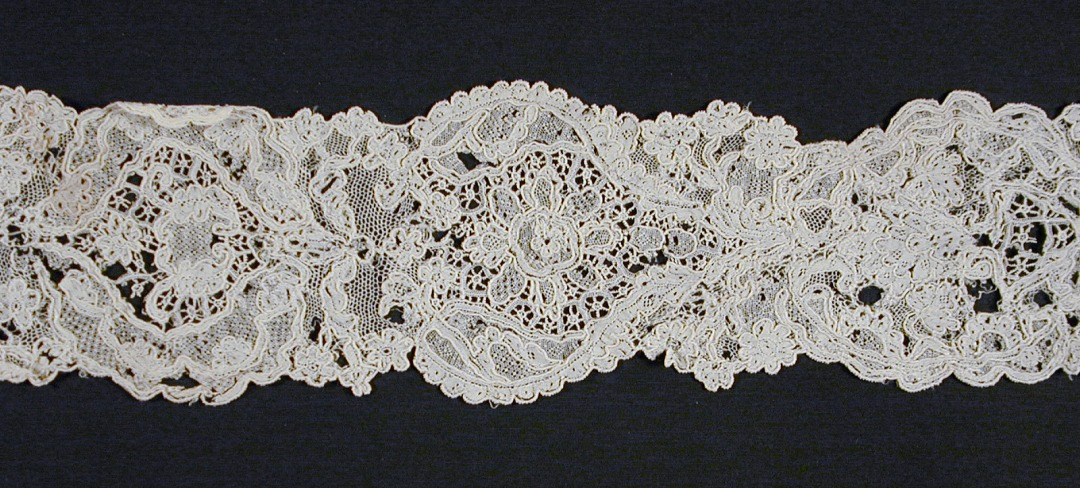
- A piece of point de France lace produced between 1700 and 1725
- Type: Lace
- Production method: Needle lace
- Production process: Craft production
- Place of origin: France
- Introduced: 17th century

Point de France is a type of needle lace developed in the late 17th century. It is characterized by rich and symmetrical detail, and a reliance on symbols associated with King Louis XIV of France, such as suns, sunflowers, fleurs-de-lys, and crowns.

== History ==
During the 1660s, King Louis XIV of France was spending extravagant sums on lace from the Republic of Venice, particularly a type known as point de Venise, to the dismay of his finance minister, Jean-Baptiste Colbert. In order to redirect this spending into the French economy, Colbert set up a number of official royal lace factories, which were to produce a type of lace he named point de France. He worked with the French ambassador to Venice to tempt needle-workers from Venice, Italy, and Flanders to emigrate to France, prompting Domenico II Contarini, the Doge of Venice, to declare that defection to France by needle-workers was a treasonous act punishable by execution or assassination. It is unclear whether this threat was ever carried out; regardless, enough Venetian needle-workers emigrated that the French quickly learned to produce high-quality lace.

Point de France was popularized by the clergy, who used it for the ornaments of their rochets, a type of clerical vestment.

Most surviving pieces from the 16th and 17th centuries are now in museums.
