= Rakematiz =

Gold-embroidered silk fabric

Rakematiz is a thick silk fabric embroidered with strands of gold. It was extremely rare and valuable in earlier eras. Apparel that incorporated rakematiz was popular in Europe in the Middle Ages.

Some scholars have suggested the term rakematiz comes from the Italian word ricamata, which means embroidery.
