= Bengaline =

Woven fabric

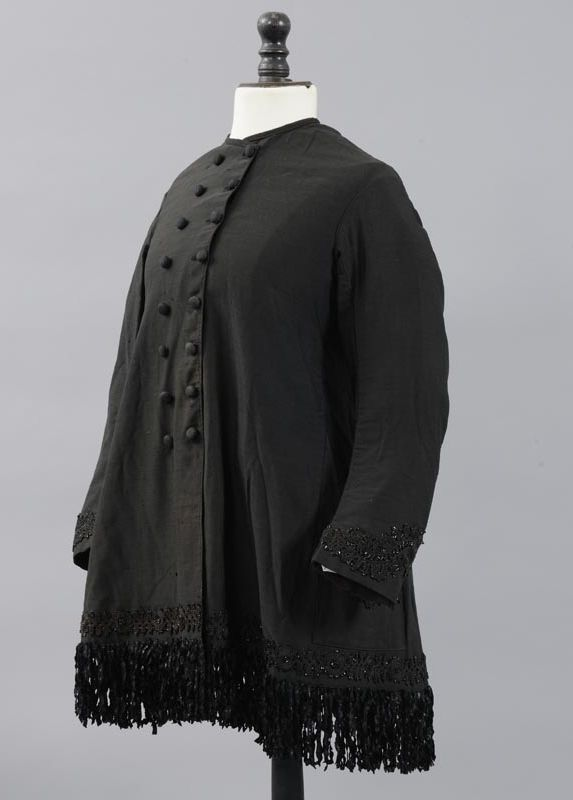
1880s woman's paletot in black bengaline

Bengaline is a rayon-and-cotton material which became fashionable for women and children to wear in the 1880s and 1890s. It offered the impression of genuine silk but was made with lesser amounts of silk than cotton. Lizzie Borden stated at her August 1892 inquest that she was wearing a dress made of bengaline silk on the morning she was accused of murdering her father and stepmother.

The fabric went out of fashion when completely smooth-surfaced materials became popular. Piqué, coachman's whipcord, diagonal serge, and surah are similar to bengaline silk. Surah was once known in France as silk serge.

Bengaline silk sold for $2.50 per yard in 1889 but was sometimes discounted to sell for $1.25 per yard. A heavy lined, long cloak for infants, with deep bengaline silk embroidery, retailed for $7.98 at a Manhattan, New York clothing shop, in 1893. Diagonal striped dresses featuring the fabric were popular in the spring of 1912.

== Côtelé ==
Cotele was a French term to describe bengaline.Côtelé driven from costelé refers to a ribbed pattern.
