= Eolienne =

Lightweight fabric with a ribbed surface

Eolienne (also spelled aeolian) is a lightweight fabric with a ribbed (corded) surface. Generally made by combining silk and cotton or silk and worsted warp and weft, it is similar to poplin but of an even lighter weight.

In common with poplin, it was originally a dress fabric and the weave combining heavier and lighter yarns created a brocade-like surface decoration and lustrous finish. This made it popular for formal gowns such as wedding attire, especially during the Edwardian era. The addition of wool or cotton made it less expensive than pure silk while creating a luxurious effect.

Its name is said to derive from Aeolus, ruler of the wind in Greek mythology.
