= Lace =

Openwork fabric, patterned with open holes in the work, made by machine or by hand

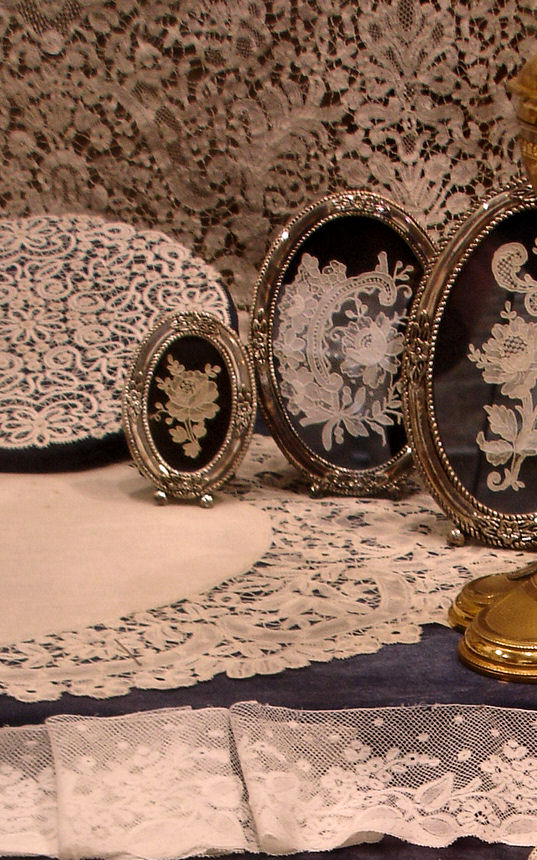
Valuable old lace, cut and framed for sale in Bruges, Belgium

Lace is a decorative openwork textile consisting of a pattern of holes. Various techniques can be employed to form lace, for example needle lace, which uses needle and thread, or cutwork, which uses pre-existing fabric. Lace can be made by hand or machine.

Lace is commonly used as an embellishment for clothing or household linens. The origin of lace is unclear, however the earliest examples are from 16th-century Italy.

Lace can be made of any thread, though cotton is widely used. Early forms of lace were made of linen, silk, gold, or silver thread. Manufactured lace is often made of synthetic fiber. Some modern artists make lace with fine copper or silver wire instead of thread.

== Etymology ==
The word lace is from Middle English. In Vulgar Latin *laceum, or in Latin laqueus, means noose. In Old French las means noose or string. A noose describes an open space outlined with rope or thread. This description applies to many types of open fabric resulting from "looping, plaiting, twisting, or knotting...threads...by hand or machine."

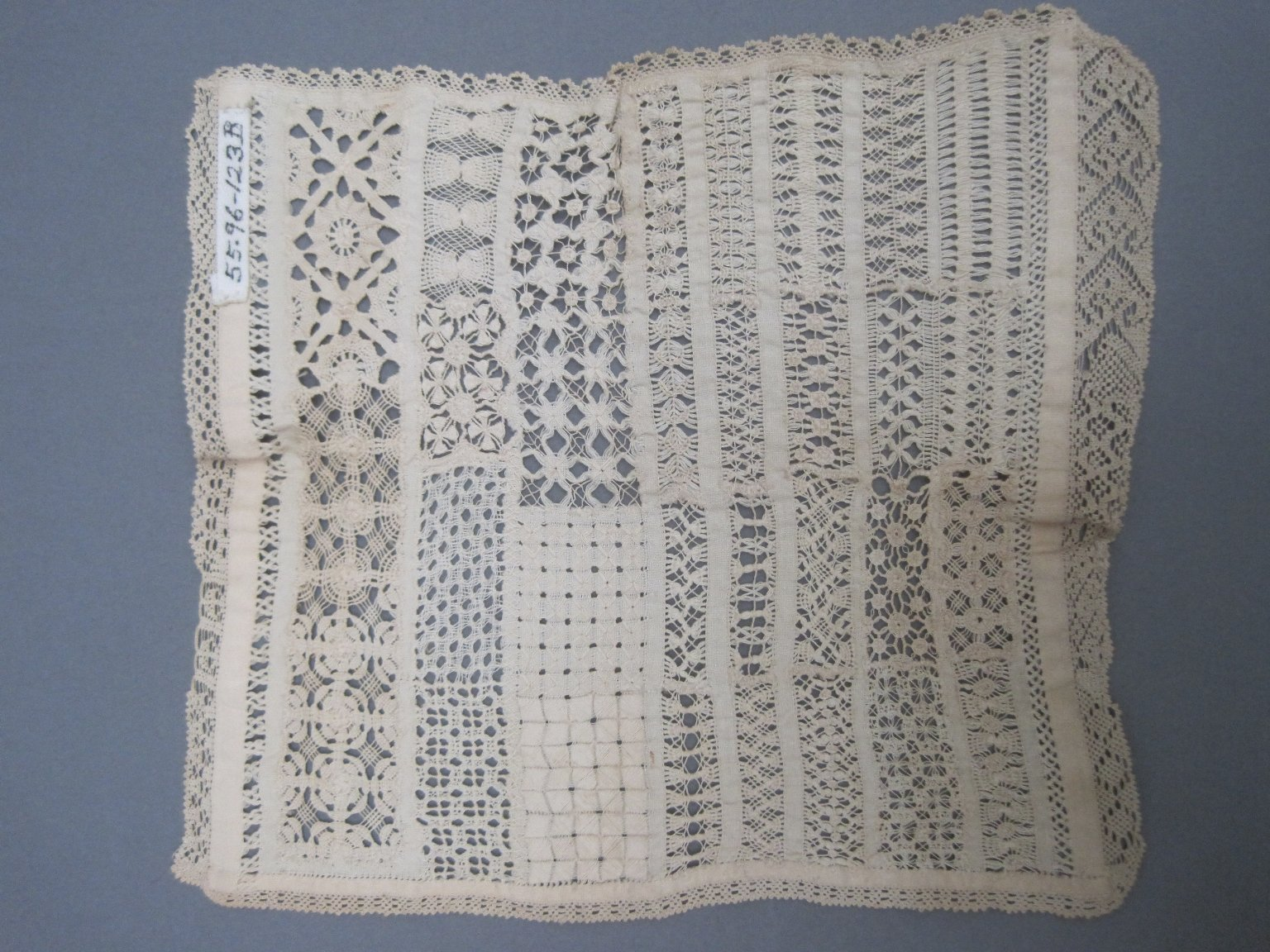
Square Lace "Sampler," 1800–1825, Brooklyn Museum

== Types ==
There are many types of lace, classified by how they are made. These include:

- Bobbin lace, also known as bone lace, is made with bobbins and a stiff pillow. The bobbins, turned from wood, bone, or plastic, carry threads which are woven together and pinned in place on a pillow fitted with a pattern template. Bobbin lace pillows are made of straw, or other materials like sawdust, insulation styrofoam, or ethafoam. An example of a style of bobbin lace is Chantilly lace.
- Chemical lace: a stitching ground made of a water-soluble or non-heat-resistant material is embroidered with a continuous motif. The stitching areas are then dissolved so only the embroidery remains. Chemical lace is typically made by machine.
- Crocheted lace uses thin thread and crochet stitches to create openwork designs. This includes Irish crochet, pineapple crochet, and filet crochet.
- Cutwork, drawn thread work, or whitework, is lace constructed by removing threads from a woven background. The remaining threads are wrapped or filled with embroidery.
- Knitted lace is made with fine thread or yarn. Different stitches are used to create openwork patterns. This includes Shetland lace, such as the "wedding ring shawl", a lace shawl so fine that it can be pulled through a wedding ring.
- Machine-made lace is any style of lace created or replicated using mechanical means.
- Needle lace, such as Venetian Gros Point, is made using a needle and thread.
- Net lace is made using a ready made net which is embellished by hand or machine.
- Tape lace can be made by forming the tape (thin woven strips) as the lace is worked or by using a ready made tape. The tape then joined and embellished with needle or bobbin lace.
- Tatting is a textile craft consisting of a series of knots and loops arranged with a shuttle or needle based process.
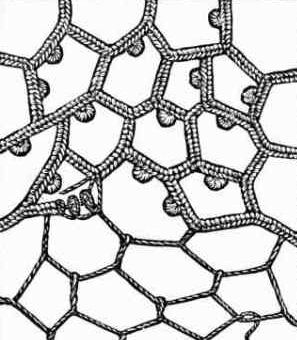
Needle lace, showing button hole stitch

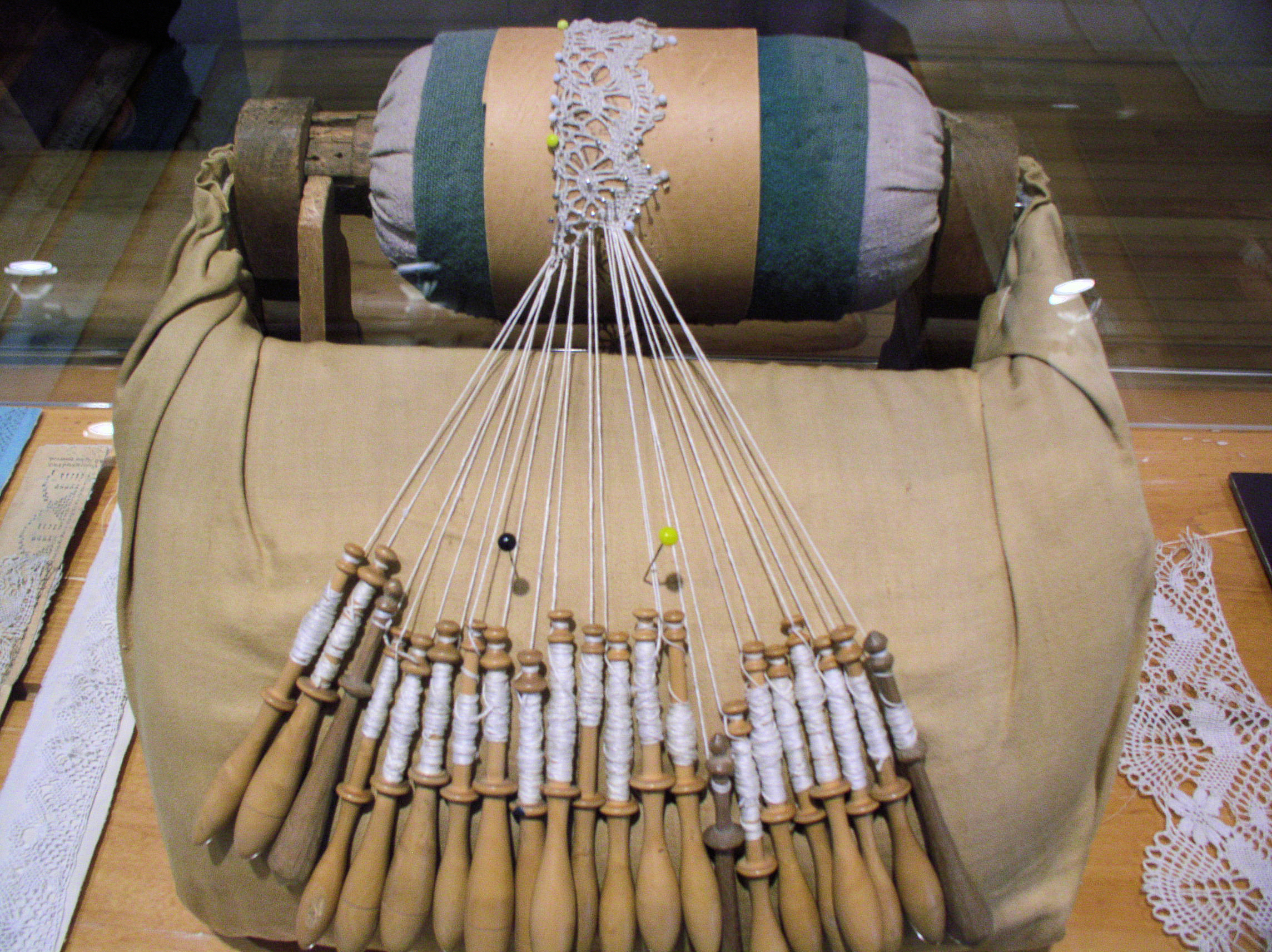
Bobbin lace being made on a roller pillow

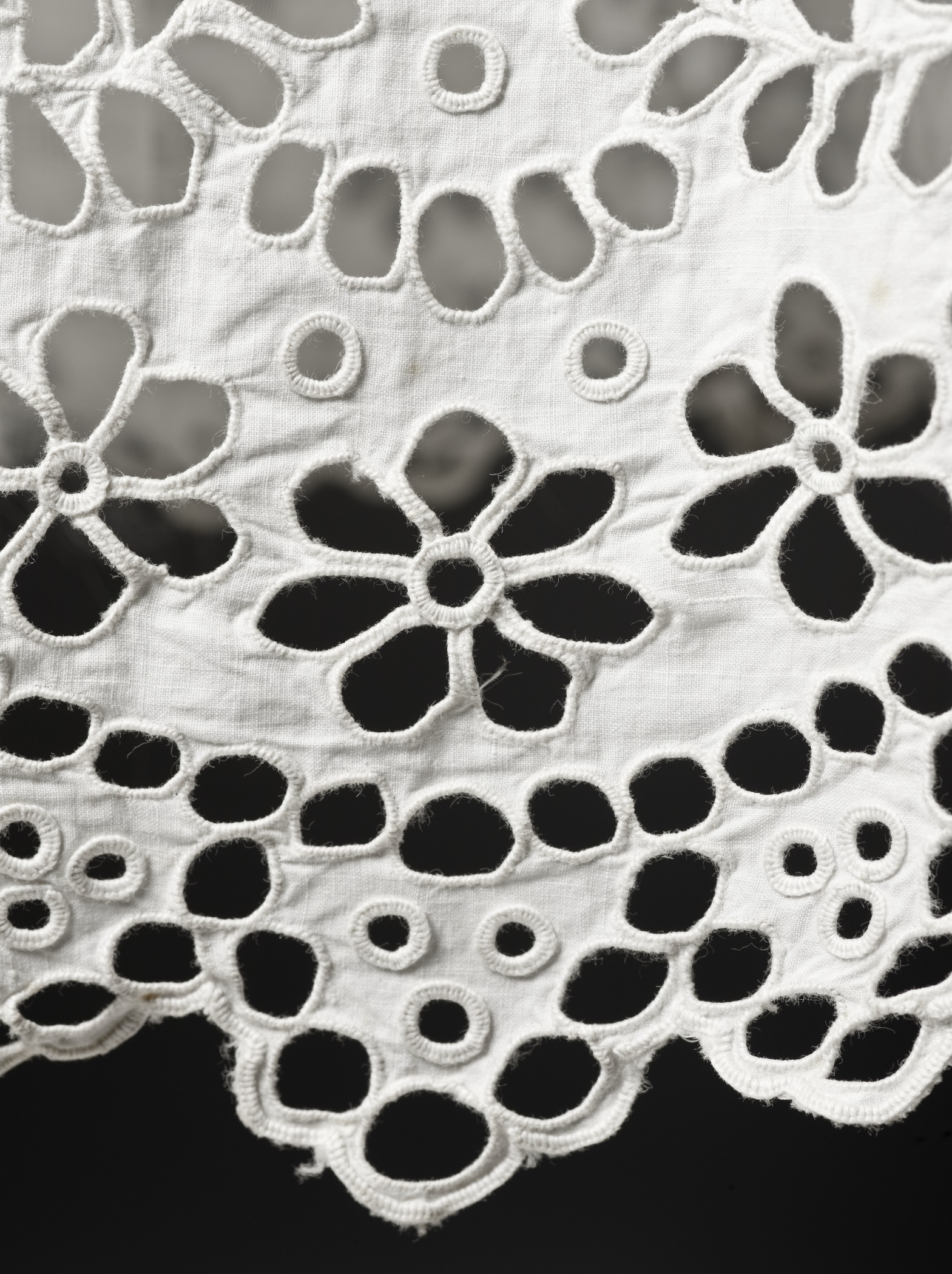
Broderie anglaise, a type of cutwork

Filet lace embroidered on an existing net

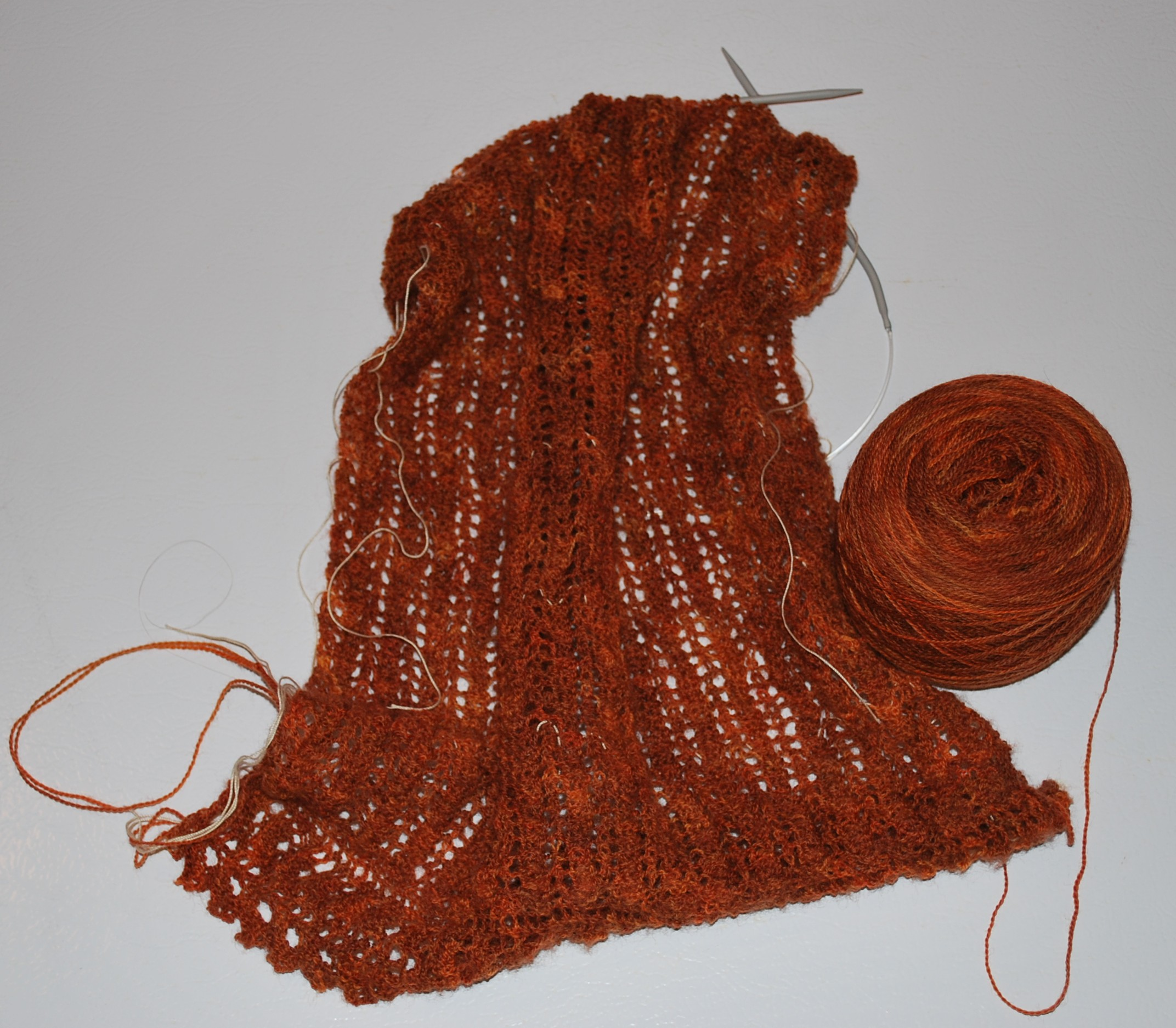
Lace knitting

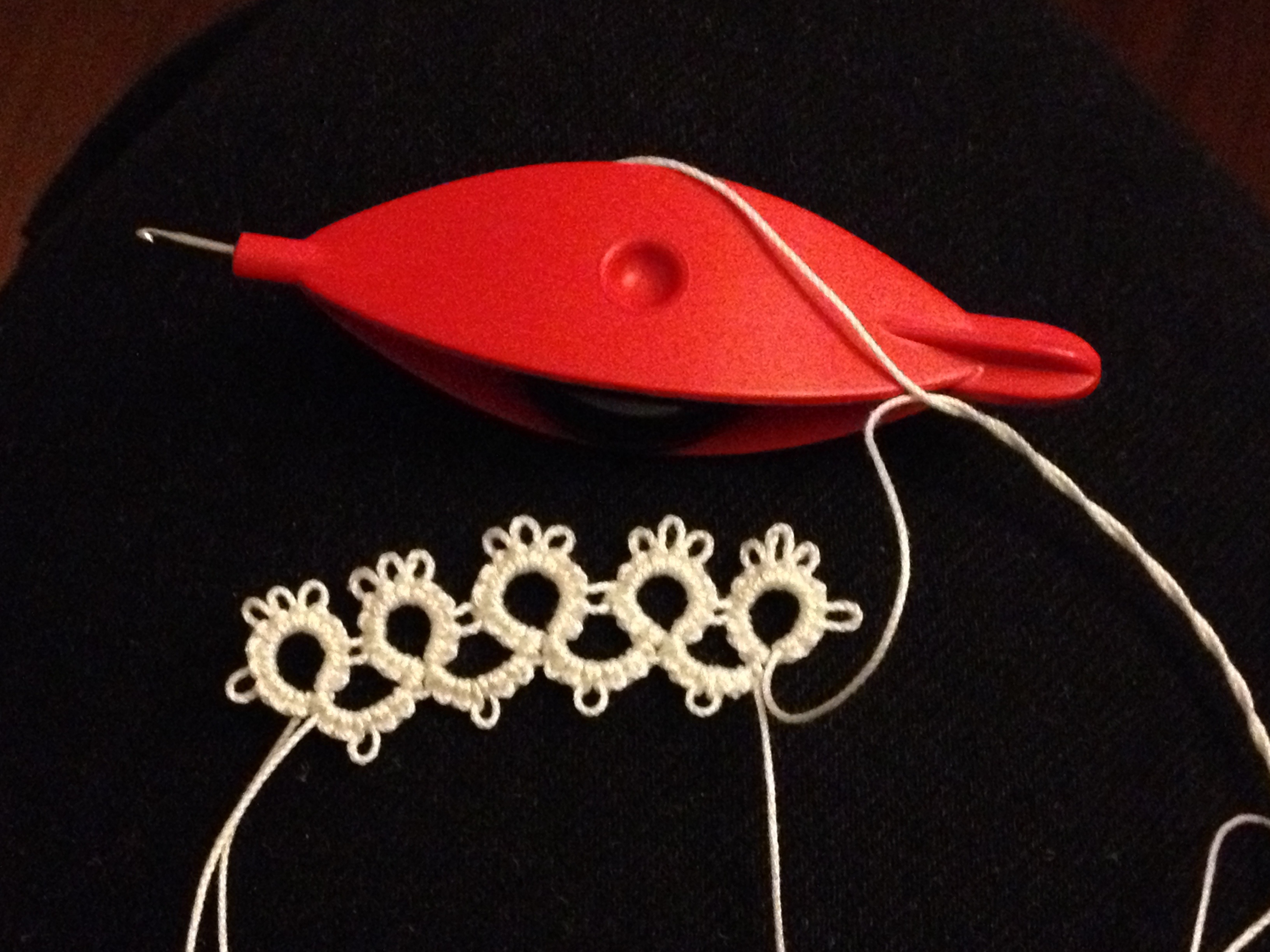
Tatting with a shuttle

== History: Bobbin and needle lace ==
=== Origins ===
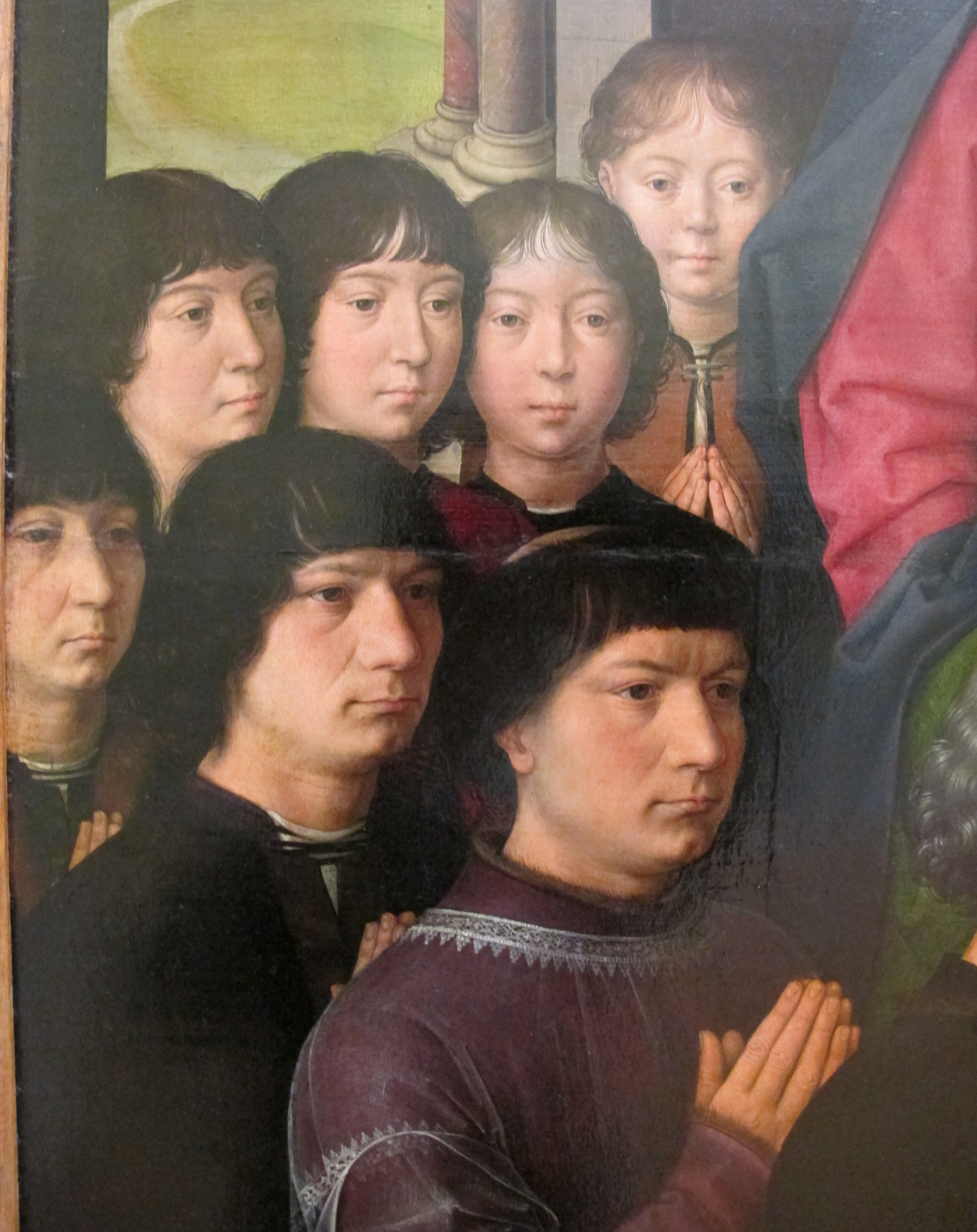
Early lace on a fragment of The Virgin and Child by Hans Memling

Since lace evolved from multiple different techniques, it is impossible to say that it originated in any one place. The fragility of lace means that few exceedingly old specimens are extant. The origin of lace is disputed by historians. An Italian claim is a will of 1493 by the Milanese Sforza family. A Flemish claim is lace on the alb of a worshiping priest in a painting about 1485 by Hans Memling.

=== Early history ===
Lace was used by clergy of the Catholic Church as part of vestments in religious ceremonies. Much of their lace was made of gold, silver, and silk. The early forms of lace were made using cutwork techniques. Wealthy people began to use such expensive lace in clothing trimmings and furnishings. In the 1300s and 1400s heavy duties were imposed on lace, and strict sumptuary laws were passed in the Italian states. This led to less demand for lace. In the mid-1400s some lacemakers turned to using flax, which cost less, while others migrated, bringing the industry to other countries.

Lace came into widespread use in the 16th century in the northwestern part of the European continent. The popularity of lace increased rapidly and the lace making cottage industry spread throughout Europe. The late 16th century marked the rapid development of lace. Both needle lace and bobbin lace became dominant in fashion and home décor. Sumptuary laws in many countries had a major impact on lace wearing and production throughout its early history, though in some countries they were often ignored or worked around.

=== Italy ===
Bobbin and needle lace were both being made in Italy early in the 1400s. Documenting lace in Italy in the 15th century is a list of fine laces from the inventory of Beatrice d'Este, Duchess of Milan, from 1493.

==== Venice ====
In Venice, lace making was originally the province of leisured noblewomen who used it as a pastime. Some of the wives of doges also supported lacemaking in the Republic. One, Giovanna Malipiero Dandolo, showed support in 1457 for a law protecting lacemakers. In 1476, the lace trade was seriously affected by a law which disallowed "silver and embroidery on any fabric and the Punto in Aria of linen threads made with a needle, or gold and silver threads." In 1595, Morosina Morosini, another doge's wife, founded a lace workshop for 130 women. In the early 1500s, the production of lace became a paid activity. Young girls worked in convents and the houses of noblewomen, creating lace for household use. Lace was a popular Venetian export in the 1500s and 1600s. The demand for lace remained strong in Europe even when the other Venetian exports during this period slumped. The largest and most intricate pieces of Venetian lace were ruffs and collars for members of the nobility and for aristocrats.

=== Belgium ===
A fragment of early 17th-century lace from present-day Belgium

Some examples of the lace made in Brussels in the 1400s survive. Belgium and Flanders became a major center for the creation of primarily bobbin lace starting in the 1500s. Belgian-grown flax contributed to the lace industry in the country. Extremely fine linen threads were produced that were a critical factor in the texture and quality of Belgian lace. Schools were founded to teach lacemaking to the young. The height of the production of lace in Belgium was in the 1700s. Brussels was known for Point d'Angleterre. Lier and Bruges also were known for their own styles of lace. Belgian lacemakers either originated or developed laces such as Brussels or Brabant Lace, Lace of Flanders, Mechlin, Valenciennes and Binche.Some handmade lace is still being produced there today.

=== France ===
Lace arrived in France when Catherine de Medici, newly married to King Henry II in 1533, brought Venetian lace-makers to her new homeland. The French royal court and the fashions popular there influenced the lace that started to be made in France. It was more delicate than the heavier needle laces of Venice. Examples of French lace are Alençon, Argentan, and Chantilly. The 17th century court of King Louis the XIV of France was known for its extravagance. During his reign lace, particularly the delicate Alençon and Argentan varieties, was extremely popular as court dress. The frontange, a tall lace headdress, became fashionable in France at this time. Louis XIV's finance minister, Jean Baptiste Colbert, strengthened the lace industry by establishing lace schools and workshops in the country.

=== Spain ===
By the 1600s Spain's Point d'Espagne lace, made of gold and silver thread, was very popular. Lace was made for use in churches and for the mantilla. Lacemaking may have come to Spain from Italy in the 1500s, or from Flanders, its province at the time. This lace was much admired and was made throughout the country.

=== Poland ===
A laced folk costume for women, Żywiec, Poland

The prevailing opinion is that Bona Sforza, the Italian-born queen of Poland, helped to introduce Italian lacemaking to Poland in the first half of the 16th century. This attribution appears frequently in Polish cultural history, though the precise origins of Polish bobbin lace are difficult to establish. It is certain that trade with Italy, Flanders, Silesia, and France also played an important role spreading the art of lacemaking in Poland. Sophisticated lace was primarily a luxury associated with the court, the nobility and the burghers, in particular women. During the 19th century, however, lacemaking increasingly moved into rural communities and became part of folk costumes (chiefly mobcaps and dresses) and as decorative objects inside homes. Bobowa, Koniaków, Żywiec, and Zakopane were once centres of Polish lacemaking.

=== Germany ===
Barbara Uttmann learned how to make bobbin lace as a girl from a Protestant refugee. In 1561 she started a lace-making workshop in Annaberg. By the time of her death in 1575, there were over 30,000 lacemakers in that area of Germany. Following the revocation of the Edict of Nantes in France in 1685, many Huguenot lacemakers moved to Hamburg and Berlin. The earliest known lace pattern book was printed in Cologne in 1527.

=== England ===
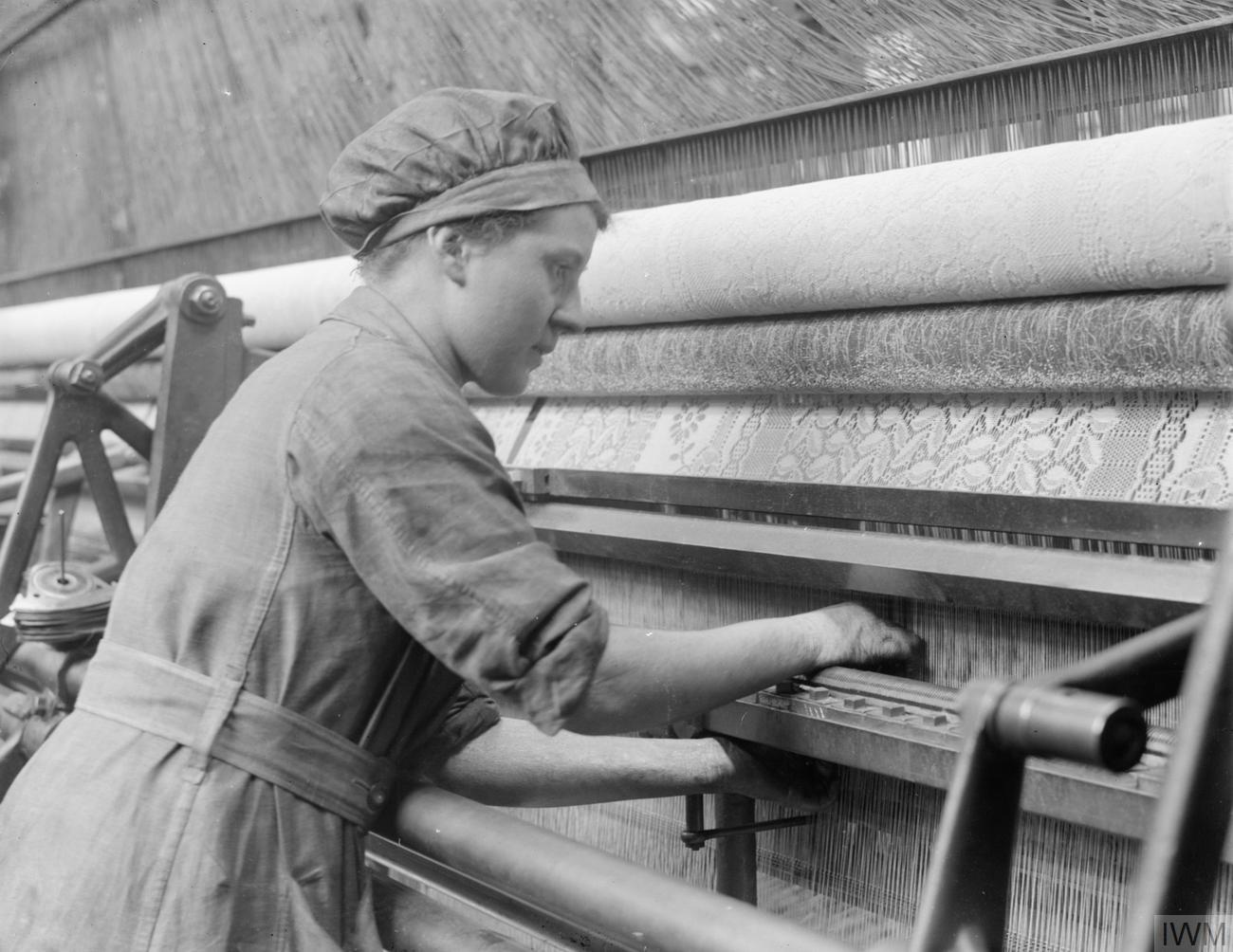
Industrial lace production on a Jacquard loom, September 1918

Prior to the introduction of bobbin lace, English lace in the mid 1500s was primarily cutwork or drawn thread work. There is a 1554 mention of Sir Thomas Wyatt wearing a ruff trimmed with bone lace (some bobbins at the time were made of bone). The court of Queen Elizabeth of England maintained close ties with the French court, so French lace began to be seen and appreciated in England. Lace was used on her court gowns and became fashionable.

There are two distinct areas of England where lacemaking was a significant industry: Devon and part of the South Midlands. Belgian lacemakers were encouraged to settle in Honiton in Devon at the end of the 16th century. They continued to make lace as they had in their homeland, but Honiton lace never got the acclaim that lace from France, Italy, and Belgium did. While the lace in Devon stayed stable, the lace-making areas of the South Midlands faced changes brought by different groups of émigrés: Flemings, French Huguenots, and later, French escaping the Revolution.

Catherine of Aragon, while exiled in Ampthill, England, was said to have supported the lace makers there by burning all her lace and commissioning new pieces. This may be the origin of the lacemaker's holiday, Cattern's Day. On this day (the 25th or 26th of November) lacemakers were given a day off from work and Cattern cakes (small dough cakes made with caraway seeds) were used to celebrate.

The English diarist Samuel Pepys often wrote about the lace used for his, his wife's, and his acquaintances' clothing. On May 10th,1669 he noted that he intended to remove the gold lace from the sleeves of his coat "as it is fit [he] should", possibly in order to avoid charges of ostentatious living.

The decline of the lace industry in England began about 1780, as was happening elsewhere. Some of the reasons include the increased popularity Classical style clothing, the economic issues connected to war, and the increased production and use of machine-made laces. In 1840, Britain's Queen Victoria was married in lace, influencing the wedding dress style until now.

=== America ===
American colonists of both British and Dutch origins strove to acquire lace accessories such as caps, ruffs, other neckwear, and handkerchiefs. American women who could afford lace textiles were also able to afford aprons and dresses trimmed lace or made only from lace. Because of sumptuary laws, such as one in Massachusetts in 1634, American citizens were not allowed to own or make their lace textiles. Sumptuary laws prevented spending on extravagance and luxury and classified who could own or make lace. The existence of these laws indicates that lace was being made in that colony at the time.

Lacemaking was being taught in boarding schools by the mid 1700s. Newspaper advertisements starting in the early 1700s offered to teach the technique. At this time Ipswich, Massachusetts was the only place in America known for producing handmade lace. By 1790, women in Ipswich, who were primarily from the British Midlands, were making 42,000 yards of silk bobbin lace intended for trimmings. George Washington reportedly purchased Ipswich Lace on a trip to the region in 1789.

Machines to make lace began to be smuggled into the country in the early 1800s, as England did not permit these machines to be exported. The first lacemaking factory opened in Medway, Massachusetts in 1818. Ipswich had its own in 1824. The women there moved from making bobbin lace to decorating the machine-made net lace with darning and tambour stitches, creating what is known as Limerick lace.

Lace was still in demand in the 19th century. Lace trimmings on dresses, at seams, pockets, and collars were very popular. The lace being made in the United States was based on European patterns. By the turn of the 20th century, Home Needlework and other magazines included lace patterns of a range of types.

In North America in the 19th century, missionaries spread the knowledge of lace making to the Native American tribes. Sibyl Carter, an Episcopalian missionary, began to teach lacemaking to Ojibwa women in Minnesota in 1890. Classes were being held for members of many tribes throughout the US by the first decade of the 1900s. St. John Francis Regis guided many women out of prostitution by establishing them in the lace making and embroidery trade, which is why he became the patron saint of lace making.

=== Ireland ===
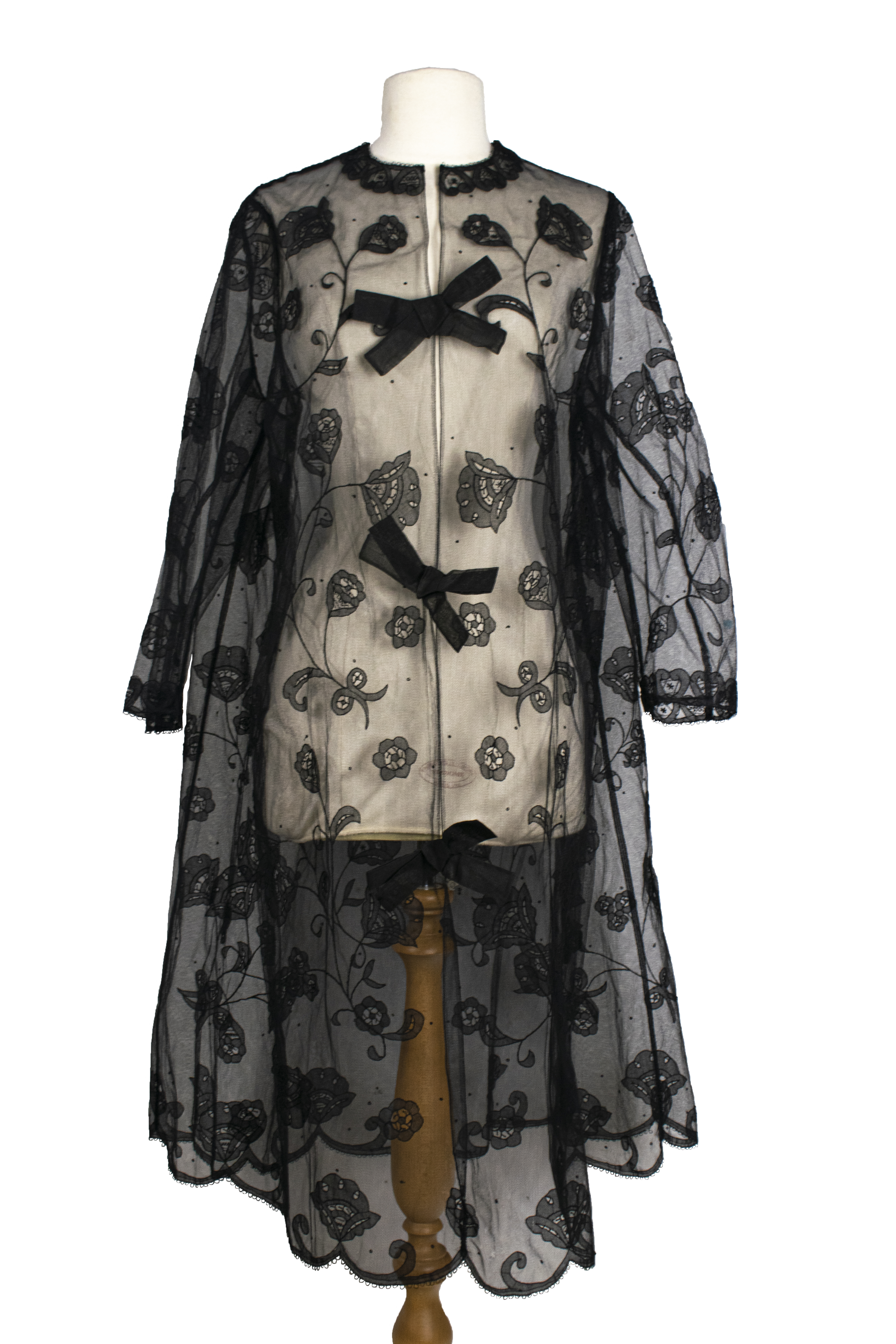
Carrickmacross Lace "Illusion" dress by Irish fashion designer Sybil Connolly

Lace was made in Ireland from the 1730s onwards with several different lace-making schools being founded across the country. Many regions acquired a name for high-quality work and others developed a distinctive style. Lace proved to be an important means of income for many poorer women. Several important schools of lace included: Carrickmacross lace, Kenmare lace, Limerick lace and Youghal lace.

== Patrons, designers, and lace makers ==
=== Patron saints ===
Some patron saints of lace include:

- St Anne
- St Catherine of Alexandria
- St Crispin
- St Elizabeth of Hungary
- St Helena of Constantine
- St John Regis
- St Paraskeva of the Balkans
- St Rose of Lima

=== Historic ===
- Giovanna Dandolo (1457–1462)
- Barbara Uthmann (1514–1575)
- Morosina Morosini (1545–1614)
- Federico de Vinciolo (16th century)
- Caterina Angiola Pieroncini (18th century)
- Florence Vere O'Brien (1854-1936)

=== Contemporary ===
- Rosa Elena Egipciaco

== Lace in art ==
The earliest portraits showing lace are those of the Florentine School. Later, in the 17th century, lace was very popular. Painting styles at the time were realistic, allowing viewers to see the finery of lace. Painted portraits of the wealthy or the nobility depicted costly laces. This presented a challenge to the painters who needed to represent not only their sitters accurately but their intricate lace as well.

A portrait of Nicolaes Hasselaer was painted by Frans Hals in about 1627. It depicts him dressed in a black garment with a detailed lace collar. Hals created the lace effect with dabs of grey and white, using black paint to indicate the spaces between the threads.

An anonymous female artisan is shown making bobbin lace in The Lacemaker, a painting by the Dutch artist Johannes Vermeer (1632–1675). This painting was completed around 1669–1670.

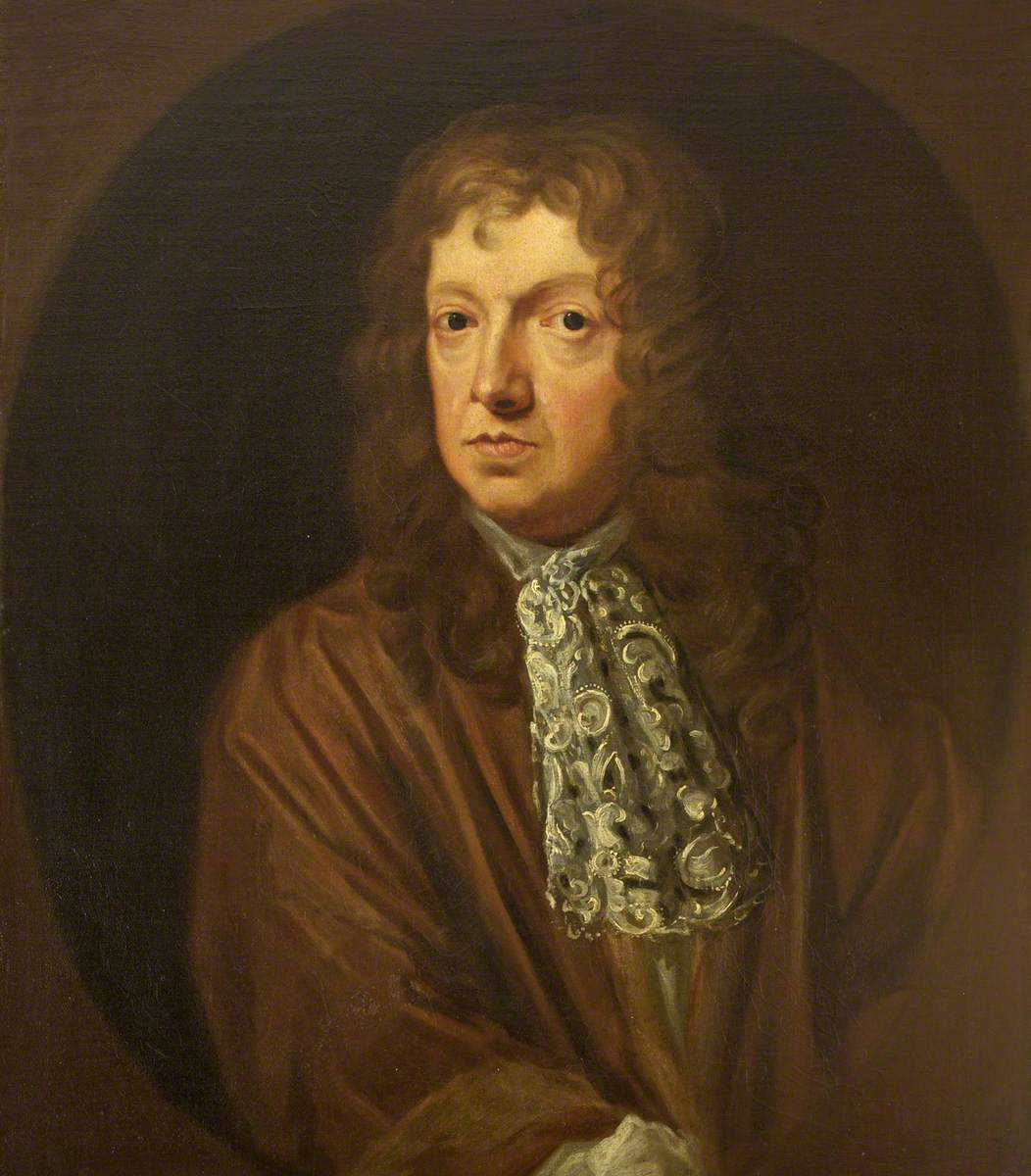
Portrait of an Unknown Gentleman in Brown with a Lace Collar by Godfrey Kneller (1646–1723)

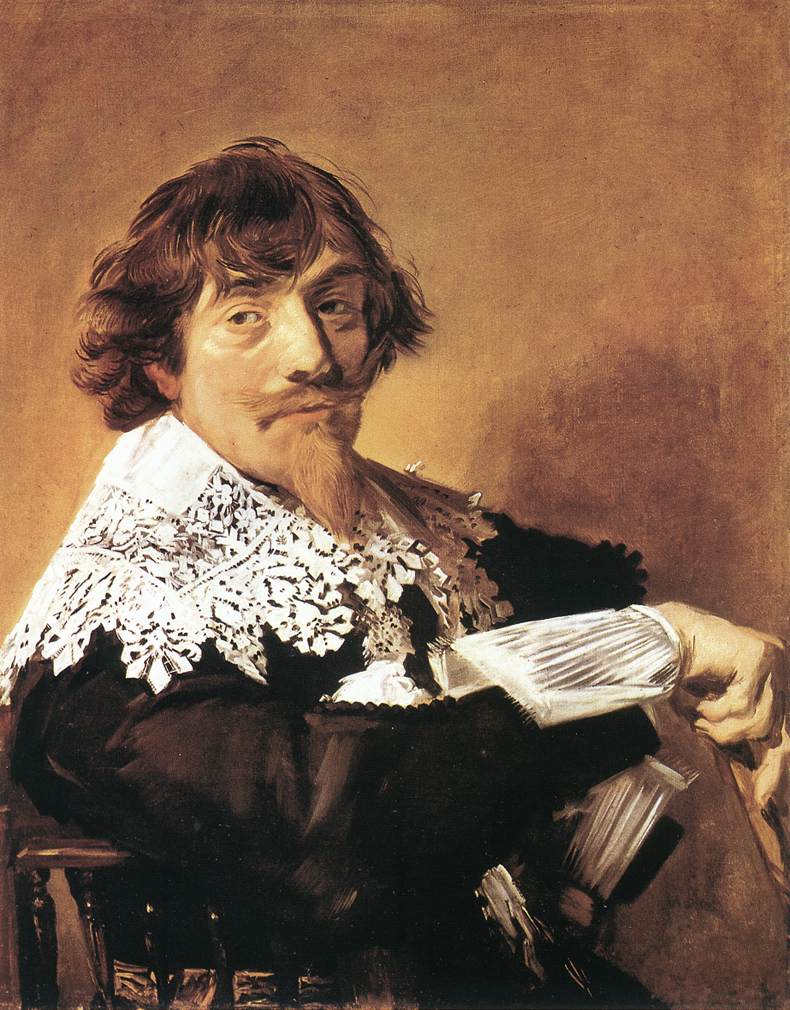
Portrait of Nicolaes Hasselaer by Frans Hals, c. 1627. Rijksmuseum.

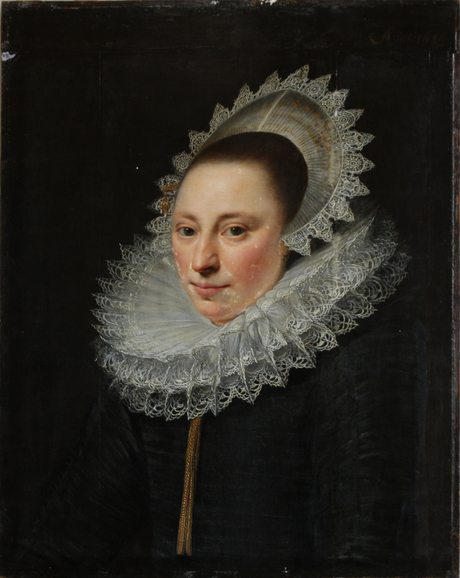
Portrait of woman by Unknown Holland painter, 17th century. National Gallery of Armenia

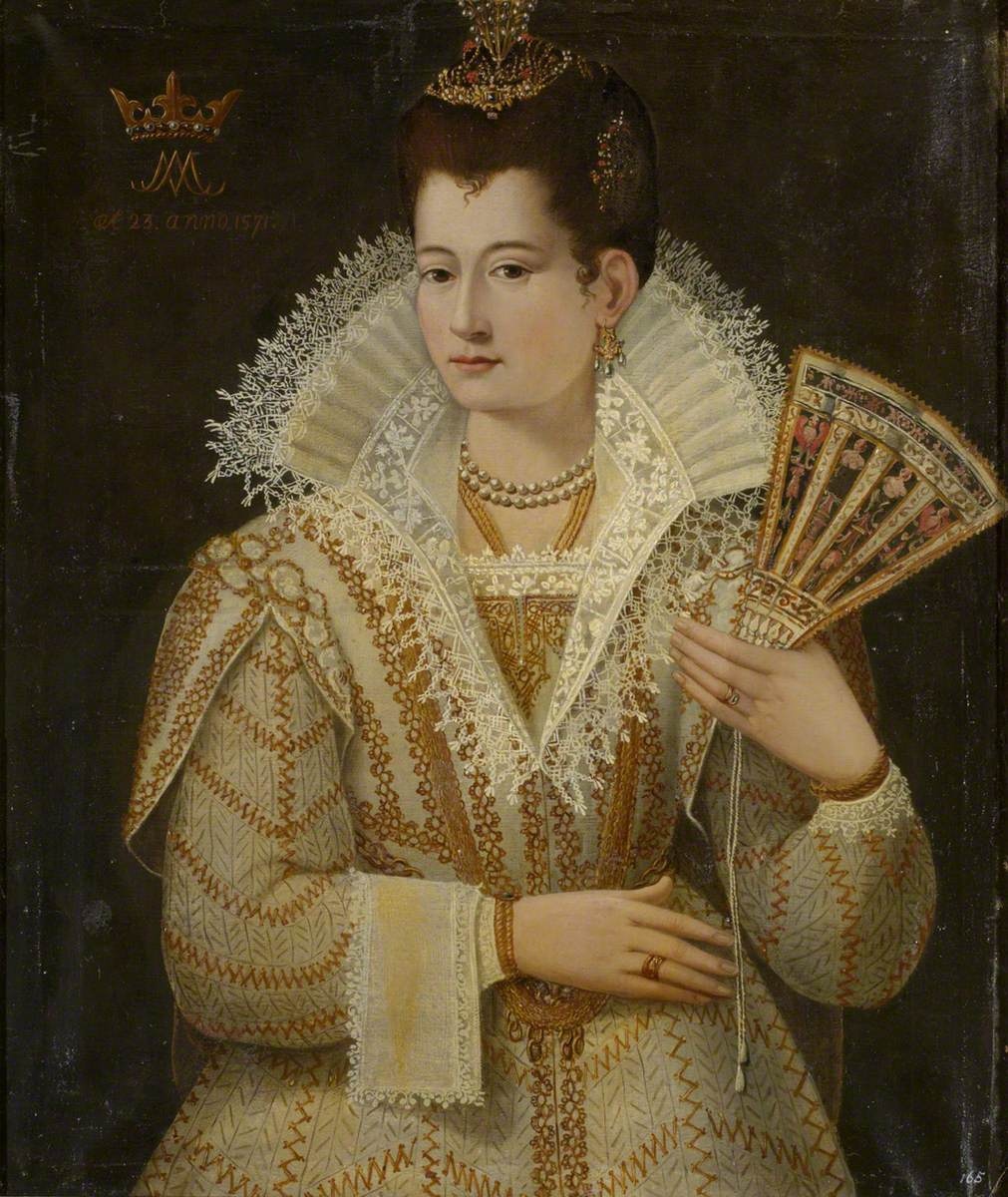
Portrait of an Unknown Lady. Florentine School, 1571. National Trust.

== In popular culture ==
The 1982 novel Lace used the fabric as inspiration for its title and the novel has also been studied as part of historical analysis of the use of the word.

== See also ==
- Anglo Scotian Mills
- Doily
- Fishnet
- Lacemaking in Croatia
- Lagetta lagetto (Lacebark)
- Lippitt Mill
- Pointelle, a similar type of fabric
- Ribbons
- Scranton Lace Company
- See-through clothing

== Museums ==
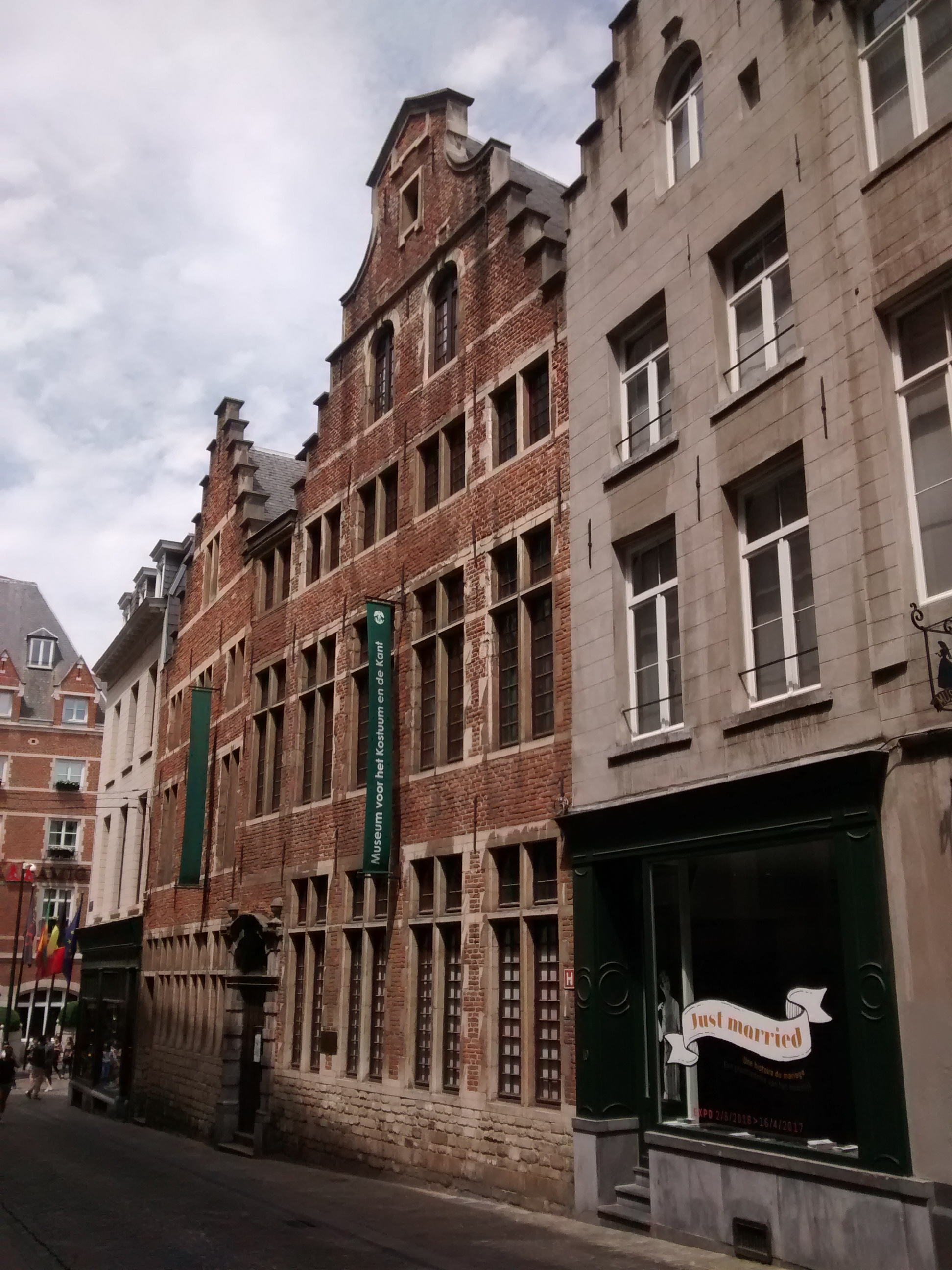
Fashion and Lace Museum, Brussels, Belgium

- Cité de la Dentelle et de la Mode, Calais, France
- Fashion and Lace Museum, Brussels, Belgium
- Kantcentrum, Bruges, Belgium
- Kenmare Lace and Design Centre, Kenmare, County Kerry, Ireland
- Limerick Museum
- The Lace Guild Museum and Gallery, Stourbridge, UK
- The Lace Museum, Fremont, California, US
- Lacis Museum of Lace and Textiles, Berkeley, California, US
- Lace Museum/Museo del Merletto, near Venice, Italy
- Marès Lace Museum/Museu Marès de la Punta, Arenys de Mar, Spain
- Musée des Beaux-Arts et de la Dentelle Alençon, France
- Museo del Mundillo, Moca, Puerto Rico
- Textilmuseum St. Gallen, St. Gallen, Switzerland, and their exhibit traveled to Bard Graduate Center in 2022 for a major New York installation, Threads of Power.
