= Alençon lace =

Type of French needle lace

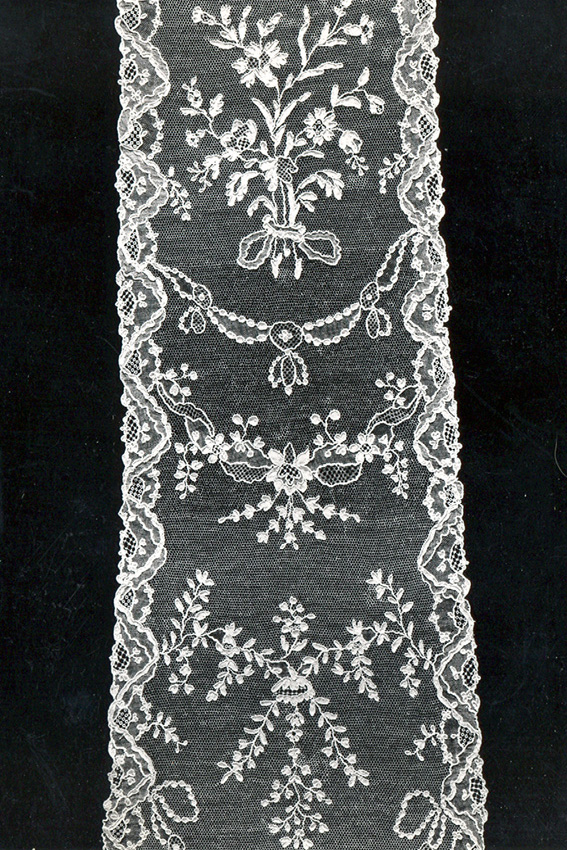
- Alençon needle lace (1760-1775), MoMu-collection, Antwerp
- Type: Lace
- Production method: Needle lace
- Production process: Craft production
- Place of origin: Alençon, France
- Introduced: 16th century

Craftsmanship of Alençon needle lace-making
- UNESCO Intangible Cultural Heritage
- Country: France
- Reference: 00438
- Region: Europe and North America

Inscription history
- Inscription: 2010 (5th session)
- List: Representative

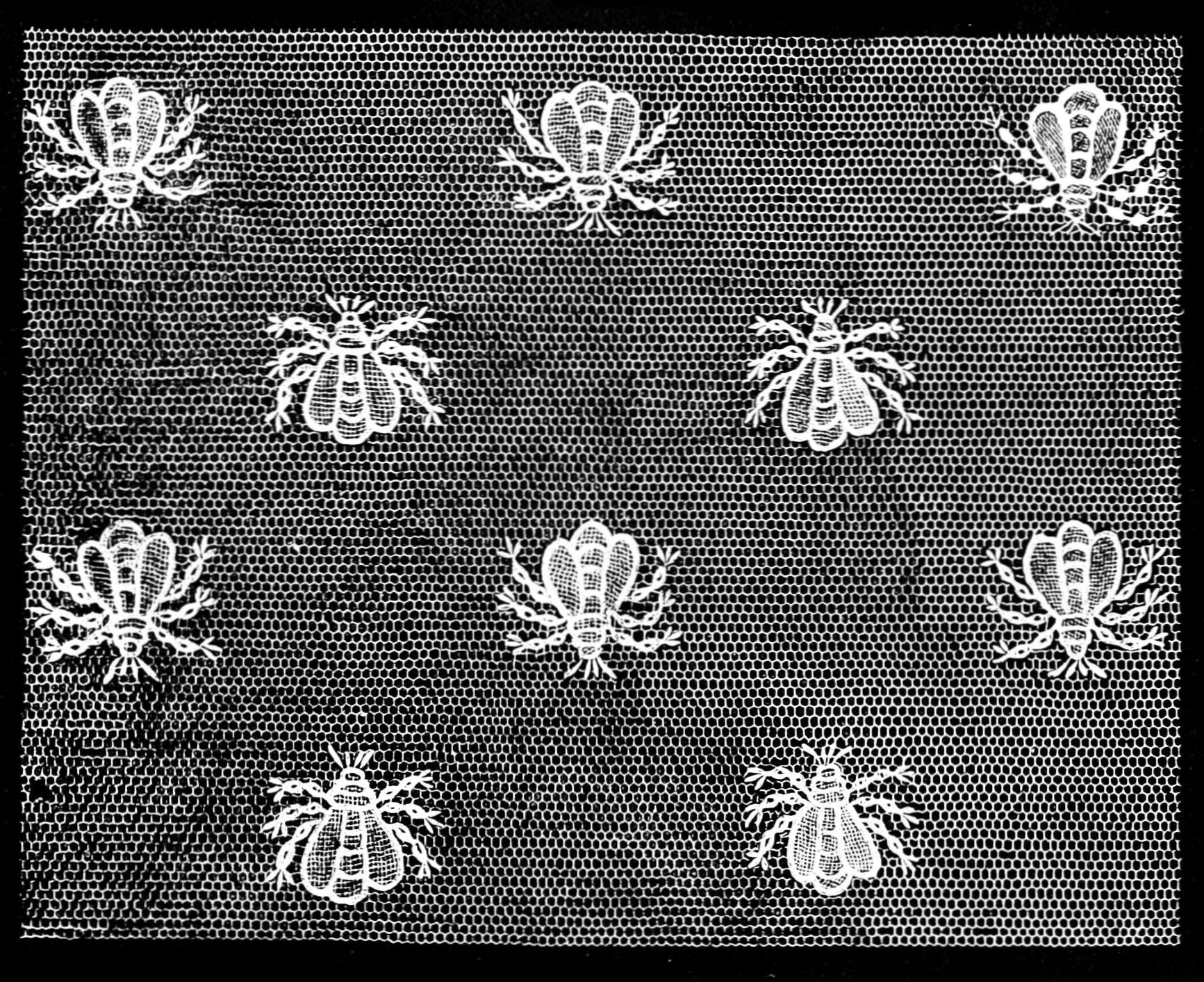
Alençon - lace made for Napoleon

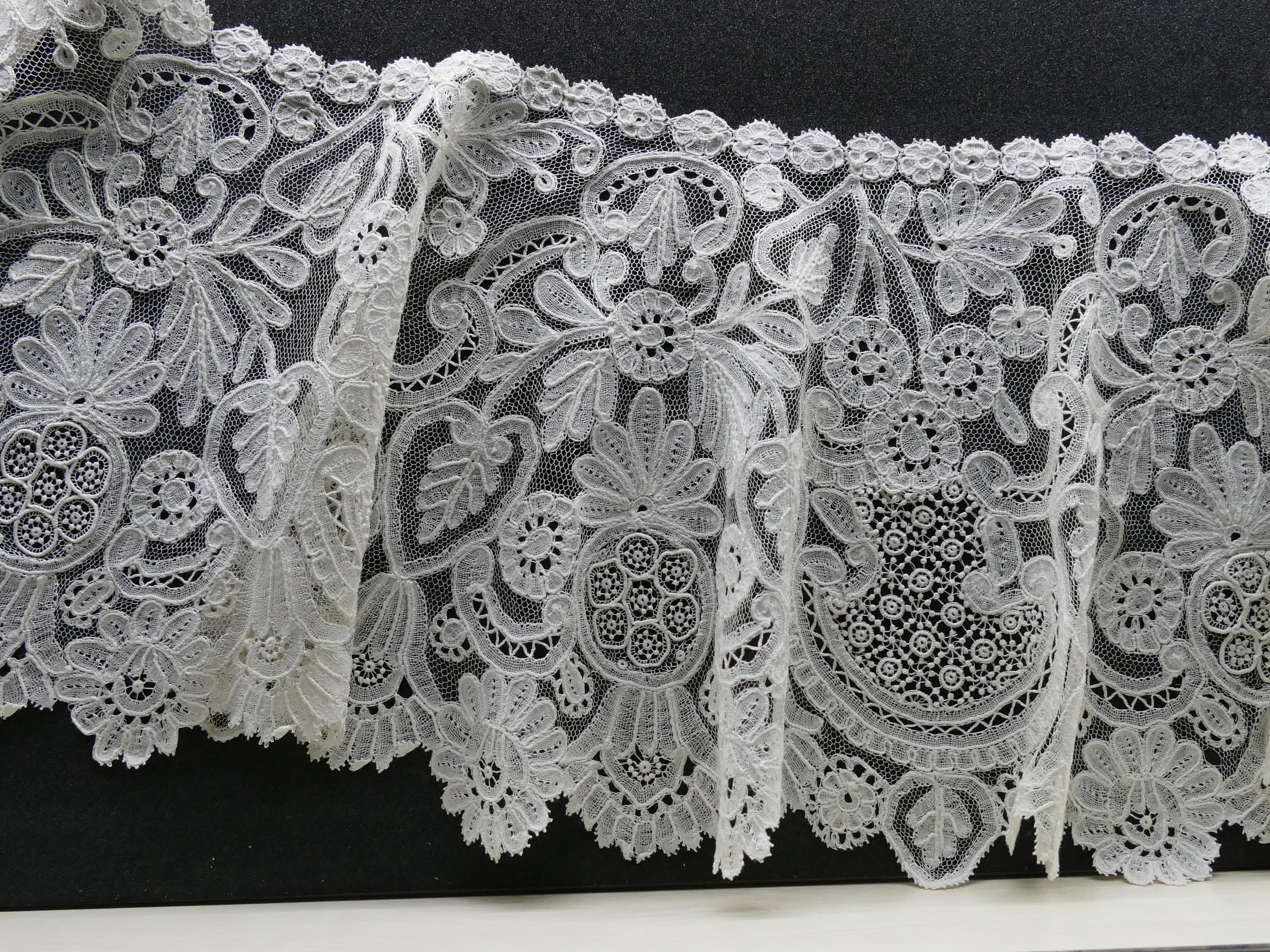
Alençon lace at the Museum of Fine Arts and Lace (Orne, Normandie, France)

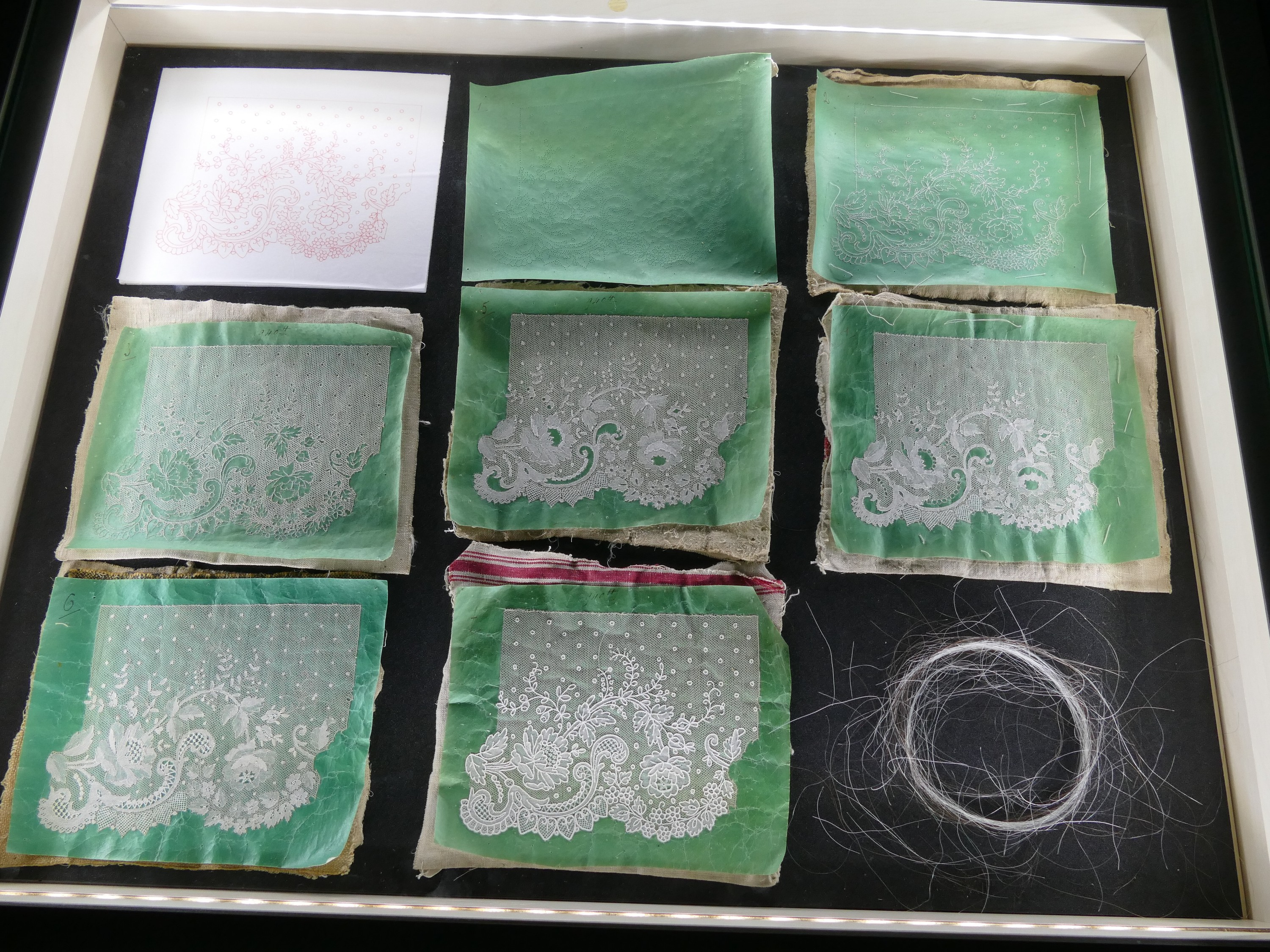
Steps in the Alençon lacemaking process (Orne, Normandie, France)

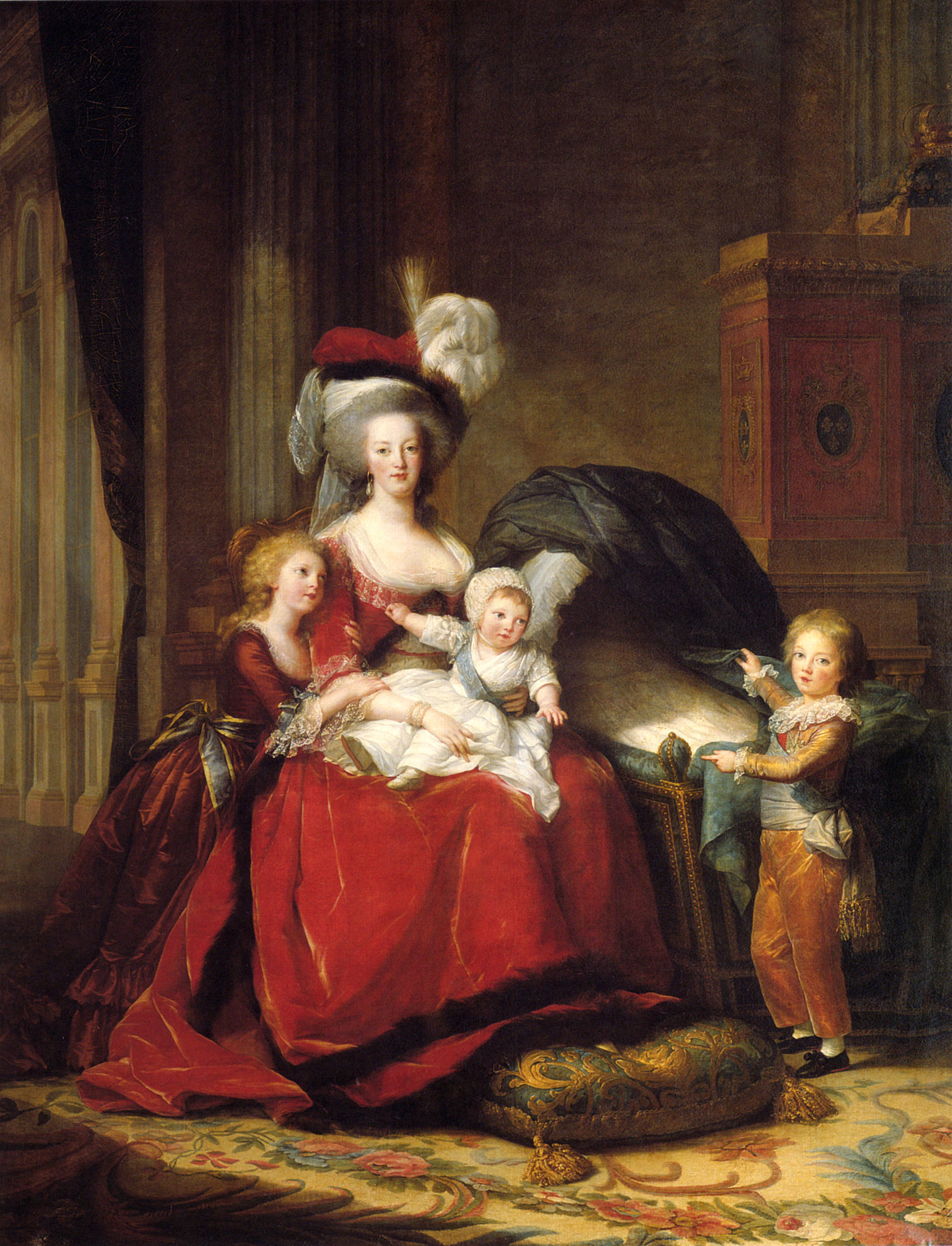
Marie Antoinette de Lorraine-Hasbourg and Her Children by Élisabeth-Louise Vigée-Le Brun (1787) Versailles, Musée national du Château et des Trianons The Queen is shown wearing a dress trimmed with Alençon lace.

Alençon lace (UK: /ˈælənsɒn, æˈlɒ̃sɒ̃/, US: /əˈlɛnsɒn, -sən/) or point d'Alençon (French: [pwɛ̃ dalɑ̃sɔ̃]) is a needle lace that originated in Alençon, France. It is sometimes called the "Queen of lace." Lace making began in Alençon during the 16th century and the local industry was rapidly expanded during the reign of Louis XIV by Jean-Baptiste Colbert, who established a Royal Workshop in the town to produce lace in the Venetian style in 1665. The purpose of establishing this workshop was to reduce the French court's dependence on expensive foreign imports. Marthe La Perrière had modified the Venetian technique and Alençon emerged as a unique style around 1675 after Colbert's monopoly ended. The lace employs a mesh ground and incorporates pattern motifs with a raised outline of closely packed buttonhole stitches, an outer edge decorated with picots, and open areas with decorative fillings.

== History ==
Though the demand for lace went into sharp decline following the French Revolution, it recovered some of its popularity during the Second French Empire.

The manufacture of Alençon lace had greatly declined even before the Revolution, and was almost extinct when the patronage of Napoleon restored its prosperity. On his marriage with the Empress Marie Louise, among other orders executed for him was a bed furniture—tester, curtains, coverlet, and pillow-cases, of great beauty and richness. The pattern represented the arms of the empire surrounded by bees.

St. Marie-Azélie Guérin Martin, the mother of St. Thérèse of Lisieux was a famous lace-maker at Alençon. Bamba Müller, the wife of the Maharaja Duleep Singh, wore an Alençon trimmed gown on the occasion of her wedding in Alexandria, Egypt in 1864. The manufacture of Alençon lace entered terminal decline at the end of the 19th century with changes in fashion and the development of cheaper, machine-made lace.

Hand-made lace-making survived on a small scale and the technique was preserved by Carmelite nuns in Alençon. In 1976 a National Lace Workshop was established in the town to ensure that this lace-making technique survives. There is a permanent exhibition of lace and a display showing how it is made in the Musée des Beaux Arts et de la Dentelle, located in the town centre and adjoining the Workshop. The workshops themselves are open to the public only on certain days of the year.

UNESCO recognised the unusual craftsmanship of this lace and added it to its Representative List of the Intangible Cultural Heritage of Humanity in November 2010.

== Techniques and Tools ==
Historically, a series of steps to create a lace design and translate it to the needlework was performed by different specialists in the process.

"Point d'Alençon is made entirely by hand with a fine needle, upon a parchment pattern, in small pieces, afterward united by invisible seams. Each part is executed by a special workman."

A design was created or selected, and the design was reproduced on paper for the lacemaker to work on directly. The working design sheet is placed on two layers of fabric for support. A pricking step to outline the design was done to provide a place for tacking threads. A trace or outline of the pattern was created by a specialist called the "traceuse". Once the outline is prepared, the ground and filling and mode motif steps could follow. Joining motifs with brides, as well as topstitching, complete the main needlework stages. Separating the work from the support layers and trimming extraneous threads finishes the series of steps, and a final smoothing step using a lobster claw to gently rub the work would ensue.

In modern Alençon lacemaking, all of the steps are accomplished by one lacemaker.

The work is created on the "right" side, contrary to bobbin lace which is typically worked on the "back" side. The work is folded over a finger of the stitcher, with the working area in focus at the top. In the Alençon style, the stitching is completed with the needle pointing upwards and the working hand moving away from the lacemaker.

== See also ==
- Alençon
- Lace
  - Brussels lace
  - Flanders lace
- List of fabric names
- Normandy
- Wedding dress of Grace Kelly

== Bibliography ==
- Despierres, Gérasime Bonnaire (1987). Alençon lace. Aberdeen: Aberdeen University Press. p. 207. ISBN 978-0-08-034512-3.
- Duval, Louis (1883). Documents pour servir à l'histoire de la fabrication du point d'Alençon (in French). Alençon: E. Renaut-de Broise. p. 108.
