= Sympatex =

Type of fabric

Logo of the Sympatex Technologies GmbH from 2021

previous Sympatex logo

Sympatex is a type of fabric that is branded as waterproof but "breathable", made or licensed by Sympatex Technologies GmbH a company founded in 1986. The fabric features a waterproof, windproof and breatheable membrane that is laminated to fabrics either on its inner surface or sandwiched between two fabric layers (often marketed as "3 layer laminate"). The latter system offers greater durability, by better protecting the integrity of the Sympatex layer from abrasion to both the outside and the inside of the garment.

== Overview ==
The Sympatex membrane is made of hydrophilic polyether-ester block copolymer, which is closed (i.e. it has no pores). Like its more common polyurethane equivalent, it can also be referred to as a monolithic membrane. No water can get in from the outside, but water vapour molecules are transported through the membrane from the inside to the outside by way of an absorption and evaporation process. This moisture transfer through the membrane is what is referred to as "breatheability."

A closed membrane like Sympatex differs from microporous membranes (such as Gore-Tex) which have microscopic pores that let air (and water vapour) pass through, yet have such low surface energy that the surface tension of any (liquid) water in contact remains too high to allow it to squeeze through the pores. Microporous membranes have traditionally been let down by the contamination of their pores which significantly degrades their breatheability and commonly also have poorer adhesion to fabrics making them more susceptible to delamination.

Sympatex's co-polymer consists of polyester for molecular strength, and polyether to transport water molecules. The membrane weighs about 30g per average jacket. The membrane is at least 5 micrometres thick, translucent, and stretchable with good stretch recovery. The Sympatex membrane is completely recyclable and relatively environmentally friendly.

== Fabrics ==
Sympatex Technologies GmbH now markets four enhanced fabrics: HigH2Out; Reflexion; Phaseable; and Airflow. It also offers 3 levels of membrane thickness for different levels of protection: Professional - heavy duty; Allweather - the standard thickness; and Windmaster - which is only 5 micrometres thick.

- HigH2Out has a more absorbent inner lining fabric in its 3 layer laminate, which over the standard Sympatex by a claimed 120%.
- Reflexion contains a coating of aluminum a few nanometres thick, sandwiched between its membrane and lining fabric, this reflects much of the radiated heat from the human body, to preserve the user's warmth.
- Phaseable, is described as 2.5 layers, lacking a lining fabric. Small foam dots sit on the exposed inner surface of the membrane. As temperature and humidity rises the membrane expands, spreading the dots apart to reduce their insulating effect and increase the membrane's surface area, and therefore increase its moisture transfer rate (its R_{et} rating).
- Airflow is a laminate designed for footwear that uses a four layer lamination, with two outer layers, the inner of which consists of a knit spacer fabric, allowing airflow and better evaporation around the outside of the membrane.
