= Romanian point lace =

Type of tape lace from Transylvania, Romania

Romanian point lace, also called Hungarian point lace, macramé crochet, or simply Romanian lace, is a type of tape lace originating in Transylvania, Romania. It also contains needlelace fillings.

== History ==
The lace originated in the early 20th century. Romanian nuns travelled to Egypt and taught the technique to families of European descendants. In England, it known as "Hungarian point lace" because it originated in Transylvania, which was once part of Hungary. Romanian point lace was first mentioned in Coats Booklet #525 Doilies in Coats Mercer Crochet during late 1960s. The lace was popularized in the U.S. by Romanian-born lace-makers Sylvia Murariu and Ioana Bodrojan: Murariu through her books, first published in 1966, and Bodrojan through interviews with PieceWork magazine. Since the 1980s, Aenne Burda's Knitting and Needlecrafts magazine has published multiple articles about the technique, calling it "macramé crochet".

== Features ==
Romanian point lace created by basting hand-crocheted cord to an intricate design and then filling in areas between the cord with needle lace and needle weaving. This technique uniquely employs a crochet hook as well as a needle to incorporate crochet and weaving techniques. Instead of a pre-made tape, as is typical in other tape laces (such as Battenberg lace), a specially crocheted cord is used, which has loops along the sides to which cords are connected for needle weaving.
