= Appliqué lace =

Types of lace

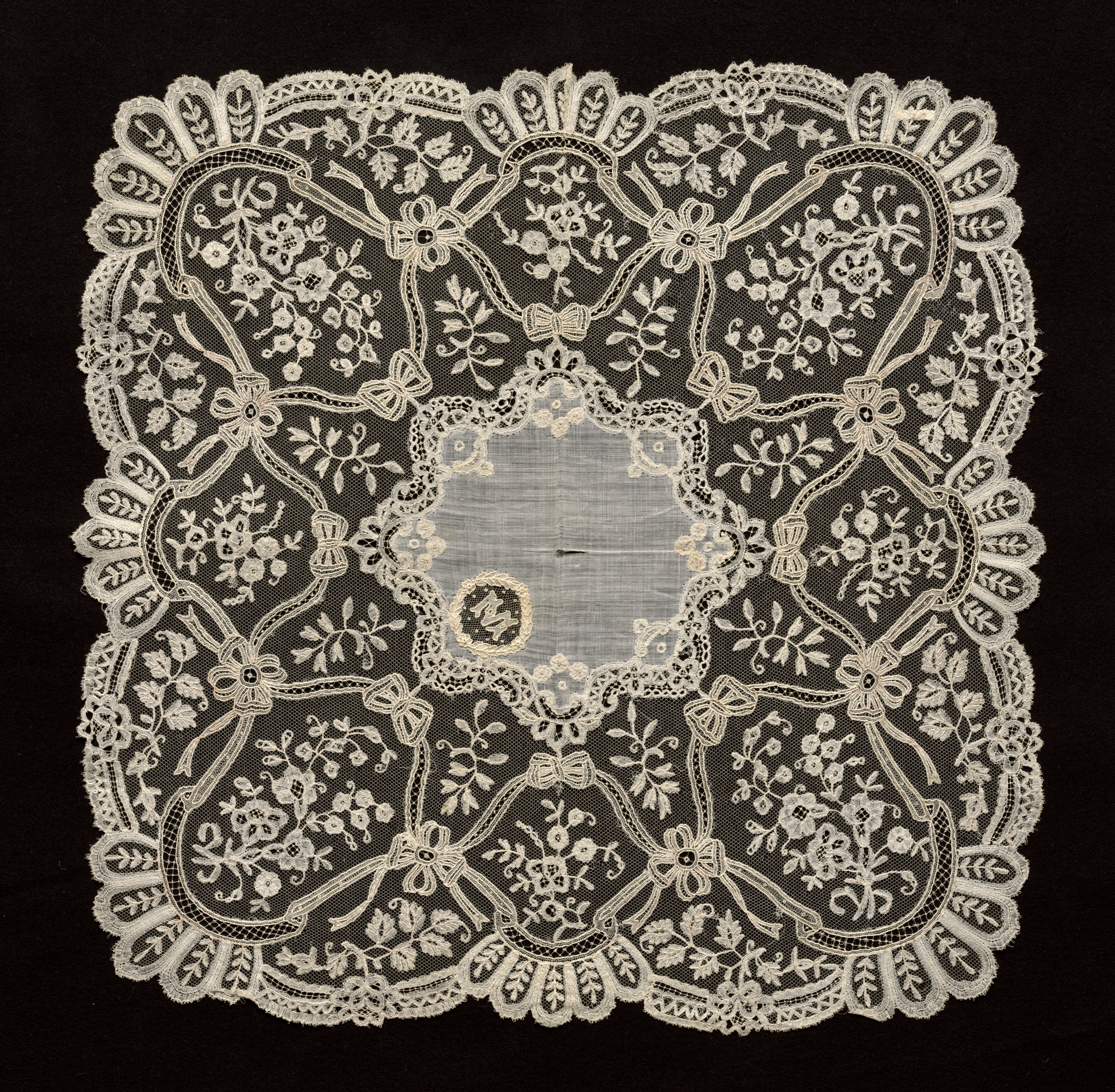
This bobbin lace handkerchief in the Cleveland Museum of Art was made using an appliqué technique.

Appliqué lace or application lace are terms for various types of lace where the decorative motifs, or slips, are attached as appliqués onto an existing openwork fabric, such as tulle, netting, muslin, filet lace, or bobbinet. When the lace is applied to netting, the result is sometimes called appliqué net lace. Motifs may also be applied to drawn thread work and cut-work. Appliqué lace is normally attached by machine or hand sewing, but can also be attached using glue. The motifs can be either made by hand—via needle lace, bobbin lace, or as embroidered fabric—or they can be made by a machine, such as a lace machine. Motifs can also be made individually, or they can be cut from larger pieces of lace fabric.

== History ==
Appliqué lace became popular in Europe and North America in the second half of the 18th century, amid the industrialization of the textile industry in those regions. Generally, it has been made with machine-made netting, with some notable exceptions. One such exception is drochel, a kind of hand-made hexagonal netting which was commonly used in Brussels.

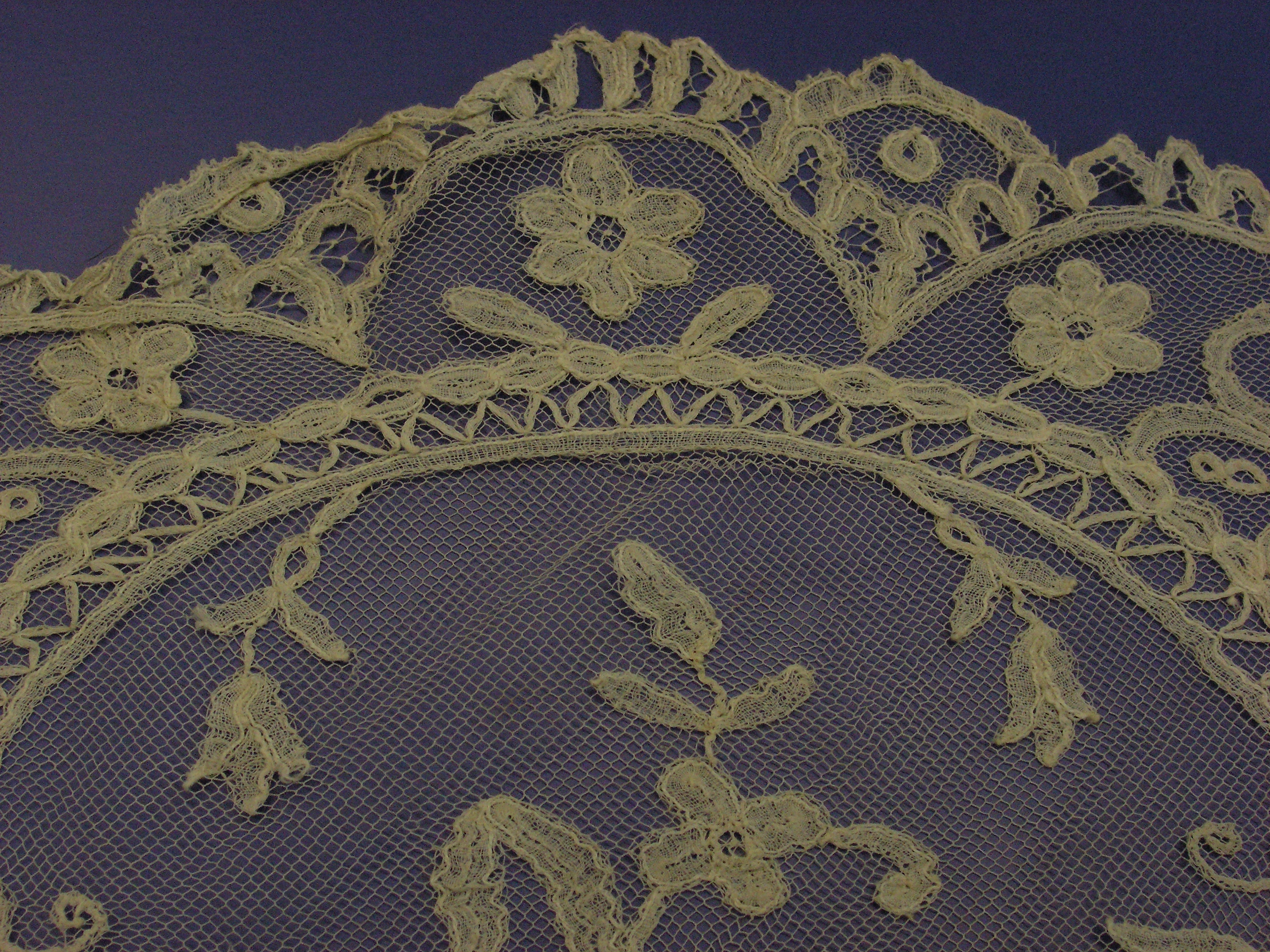
Mid-19th century flounce with Brussels bobbin lace appliqué (via the Auckland Museum)

== Types ==
Muslin appliqué lace, or muslin appliqué net lace, is made by cutting shapes from muslin or another fine, woven cotton cloth, and attaching the shapes to the netting. Carrickmacross lace is one such type of appliqué lace and is associated with the town of Carrickmacross in County Monaghan, Ireland. It is made up of three layers: lace at the bottom, then netting (usually machine-made), then muslin. It emerged in the 1820s. Belgian appliqué lace is another subtype. Machine copies of muslin appliqué lace were widely produced using on Swiss embroidery machines and schiffli embroidery machines.

There is a well-known appliqué variety of Honiton lace, a kind of floral net lace associated with the town of Honiton in Devon, England.

Needlepoint appliqué involves the use of buttonhole stitches to create the lace.

Princess lace, or Brussels princess lace, is a type of appliqué tape lace made in the late 19th and 20th centuries in Belgium. (Note: Earnshaw 1982, p. 135.)

== Usage ==
Appliqué lace is used in wedding dresses.

== See also ==
- Bobbin lace ground
- Broderie anglaise
- Embroidery
- Irish lace
- Tambour lace
