= Renaissance lace =

Type of tape lace using machine-made tapes

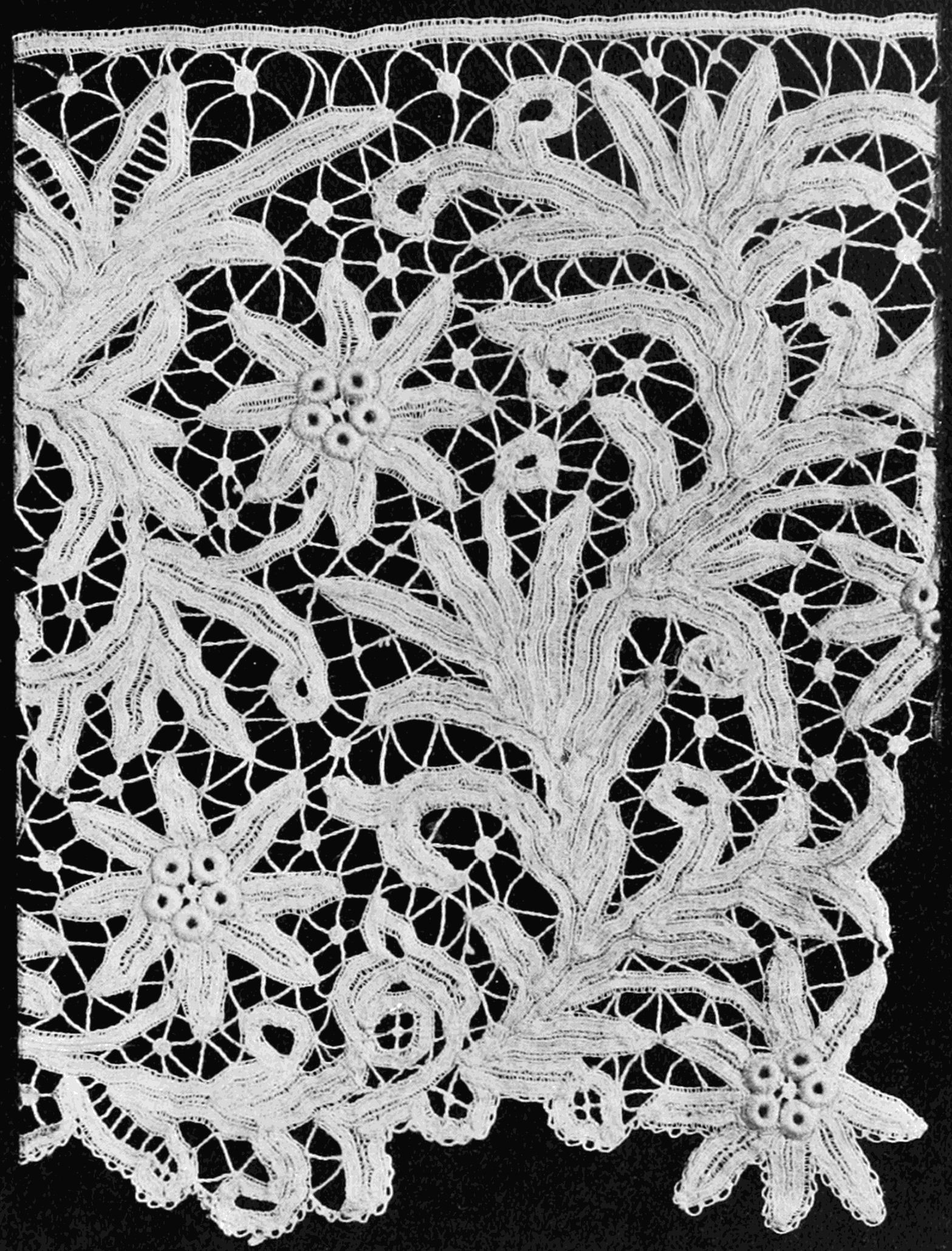
Renaissance lace

Renaissance lace is a type of tape lace. The name refers to the rebirth of antique Italian forms to create the patterns of this 19th century lace.

The outline of the design is made of bought tape. Manufacturers produced a huge number of suitable tapes in different widths and sometimes with picots or other decoration. Lacemakers would buy the tape and sew it onto a paper with the pattern. They would then fill up the empty spaces with a needle, using a variety of stitches. Finally the lace was cut from the paper. The tape laces varied from well-worked versions with a variety of filling stitches to those where the tapes were simply joined with a few needle-made bars.

Some regard the whole genre as being Renaissance lace, with varying forms such as Branscombe, Princess and Battenberg. Others regard Renaissance Lace as one of the types.
