= Undercliffe =

Undercliffe or Undercliff may refer to:

- Undercliffe, New South Wales, Australia, a neighbourhood of the Sydney suburb of Earlwood
- Undercliffe, West Yorkshire, an area of Bradford, England
  - Undercliffe Cemetery, Bradford
- The Undercliff, south coast of England, several stretches of landslip
