= Rattenbury =

Rattenbury is a surname. Notable people with the surname include:

- Francis Rattenbury (1867–1935), British architect
- John Rattenbury (disambiguation), several people
- Alma Rattenbury (1897/8–1935), English-Canadian songwriter and accused murderer
- Nelson Rattenbury (1907–1973), Canadian businessman and politician
- Robert Rattenbury (1901–1970), English classical scholar
- Shane Rattenbury (born 1971), Australian politician
