= The Undercliff =

Landslip areas on south coast of England

The Undercliff is the name of several areas of landslip on the south coast of England. They include ones on the Isle of Wight; on the Dorset-Devon border near Lyme Regis; on cliffs near Branscombe in East Devon; and at White Nothe, Dorset. All arose from slump of harder strata over softer clay, giving rise to irregular landscapes of peaks, gullies and slipped blocks, that have become densely vegetated due to their isolation and change of land use. The Kent coast at Folkestone and Sandgate also has similar undercliff areas.

== Isle of Wight ==
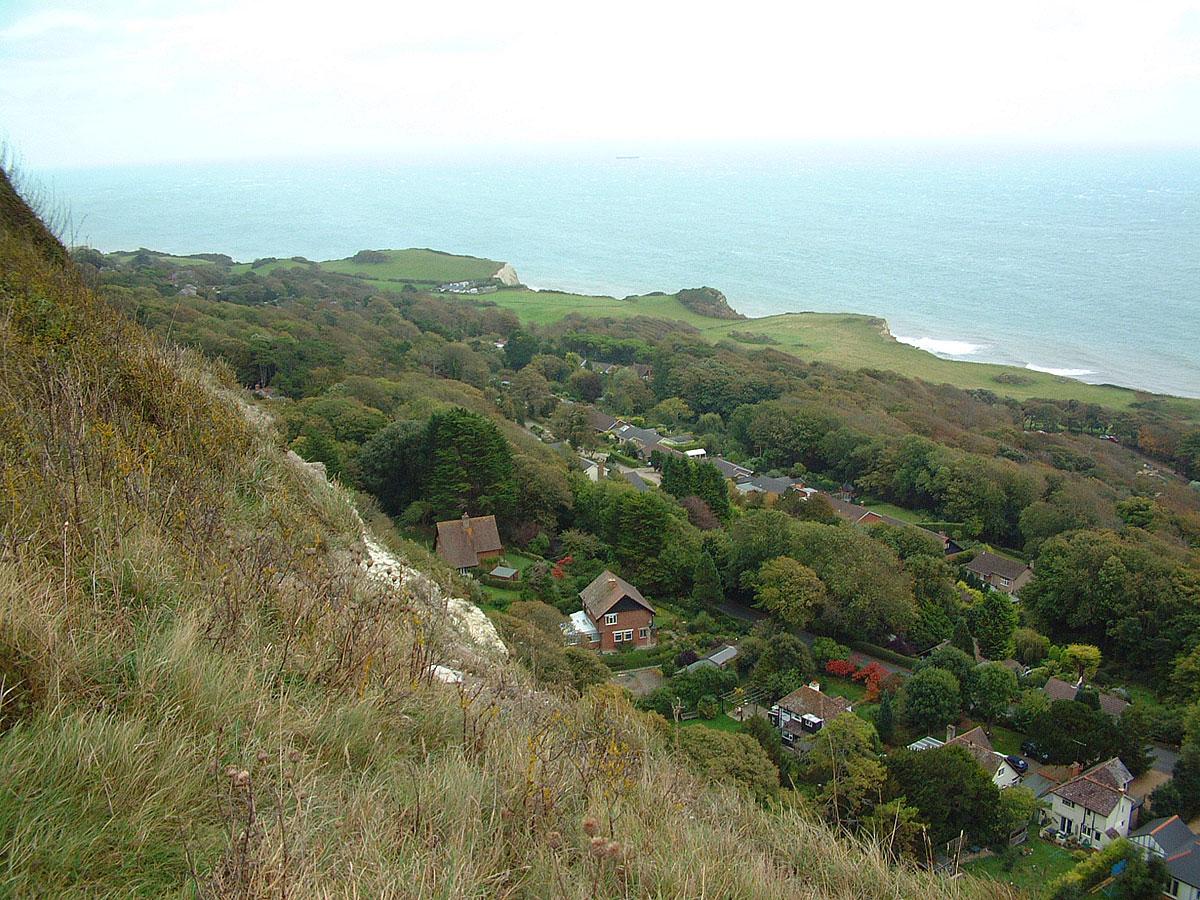
Undercliff at St Lawrence, looking down from the Isle of Wight Coastal Path.

The Undercliff on the Isle of Wight skirts the southern edge of the island from Niton to Bonchurch. A favourable climate here has resulted in a semi-tropical environment, covered by lush vegetation.

The microclimate of warm sunshine, moist air and few winter chills was recognised by leading physicians in Victorian times as a beneficial environment for sufferers of respiratory diseases. This led to the establishment by Arthur Hill Hassall of a chest hospital at Ventnor.

The development of Ventnor and St Lawrence during the mid-19th century saw the construction of many fine houses and villas, and the creation of some beautiful gardens. These developments included the now-demolished Steephill Castle, and a number of houses built for the industrialist William Spindler in the 1880s.

The Undercliff is mostly accessible by a road, Undercliff Drive, running its length from Niton to Ventnor. The road has been blocked to through motor traffic since a landslip in 2014, but remains open to vehicles from either end, and also to through cyclists and pedestrians. The Undercliff can also be accessed by foot along the Isle of Wight Coastal Path.

There are some coastal erosion and landslip concerns associated with the Isle of Wight Undercliff region.

== West Dorset ==
The west Dorset coast around Charmouth and Lyme Regis includes unstable cliffs which have given rise to undercliff areas with varied topography. There was a mudslide at Stonebarrow east of Charmouth in December 2000, and in May 2008 there was a large landslip at Black Ven between Charmouth and Lyme Regis.

== East Devon ==
=== Axmouth to Lyme Regis ===
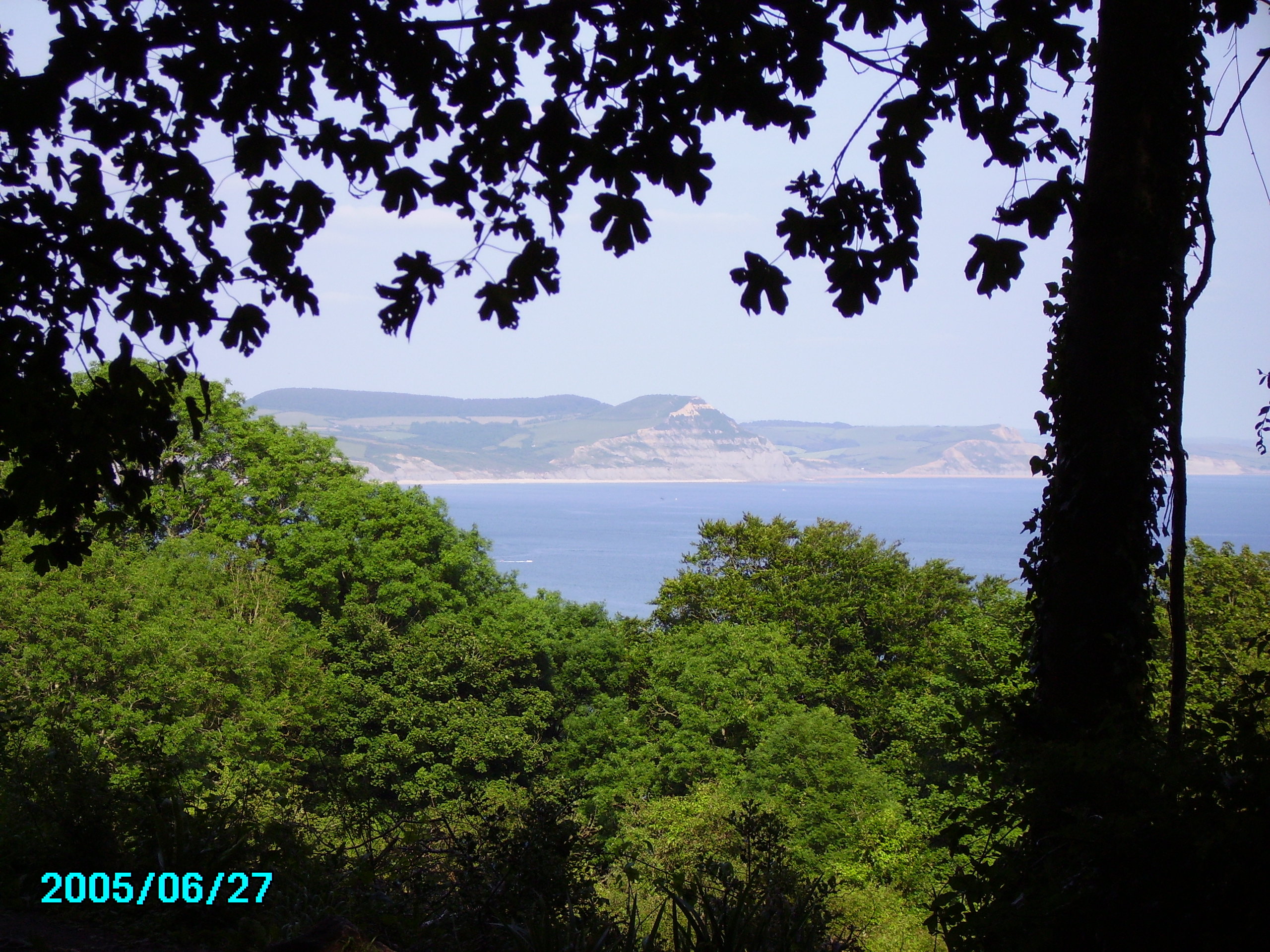
Golden Cap across Lyme Bay from the Undercliff (Lyme Regis)

The Undercliff in Dorset-East Devon stretches the 5 miles (8.0 km) between Lyme Regis, near to the Cobb harbour, and Seaton. Like its namesake on the Isle of Wight, this feature also arose as a result of landslips and has become a rare and unusual habitat for plants and birds. It is a national nature reserve – the Axmouth to Lyme Regis Undercliffs NNR – and the South West Coast Path runs through it. The footpath stretches for 7 – 8 miles (13 km) and is not accessible except at each end. It is not permitted to leave the path due to the nature reserve status and the dangerous terrain.

Some of the landslips that created the Undercliff took place within historical record. Recorded slips took place in 1775, 1828, 1839 (the Great Slip) and 1840. The 1839 slip was especially well-documented since the geologists Buckland and Conybeare were in the area to survey it. A large tract of land below Bindon Manor and Dowlands Farm slipped, creating the features now called Goat Island and the Chasm. It took with it an area of sown wheatfield which remained sufficiently undamaged for the wheat to be harvested in 1840, when the slip was a popular visitor attraction.

The Undercliff was formerly open rough pasture, grazed by sheep and rabbits, including features such as Donkey Green (an area of turf used for picnics and sports), Landslip Cottage (which used to sell teas to visitors), and Chapel Rock (where, according to tradition, Tudor religious dissenters met). However, it became heavily overgrown in the 20th century following the cessation of sheep farming and the decline in rabbits due to myxomatosis, and access is now difficult, the terrain being treacherous due to its unstable cliffs, deep gullies and dense undergrowth.

Sabine Baring-Gould's 1900 novel Winefred, a story of the chalk cliffs is set in the Undercliff area, with the Great Slip as its climax. The Undercliff was also one of the settings for the novel The French Lieutenant's Woman and a location for its film adaptation.

=== Hooken ===
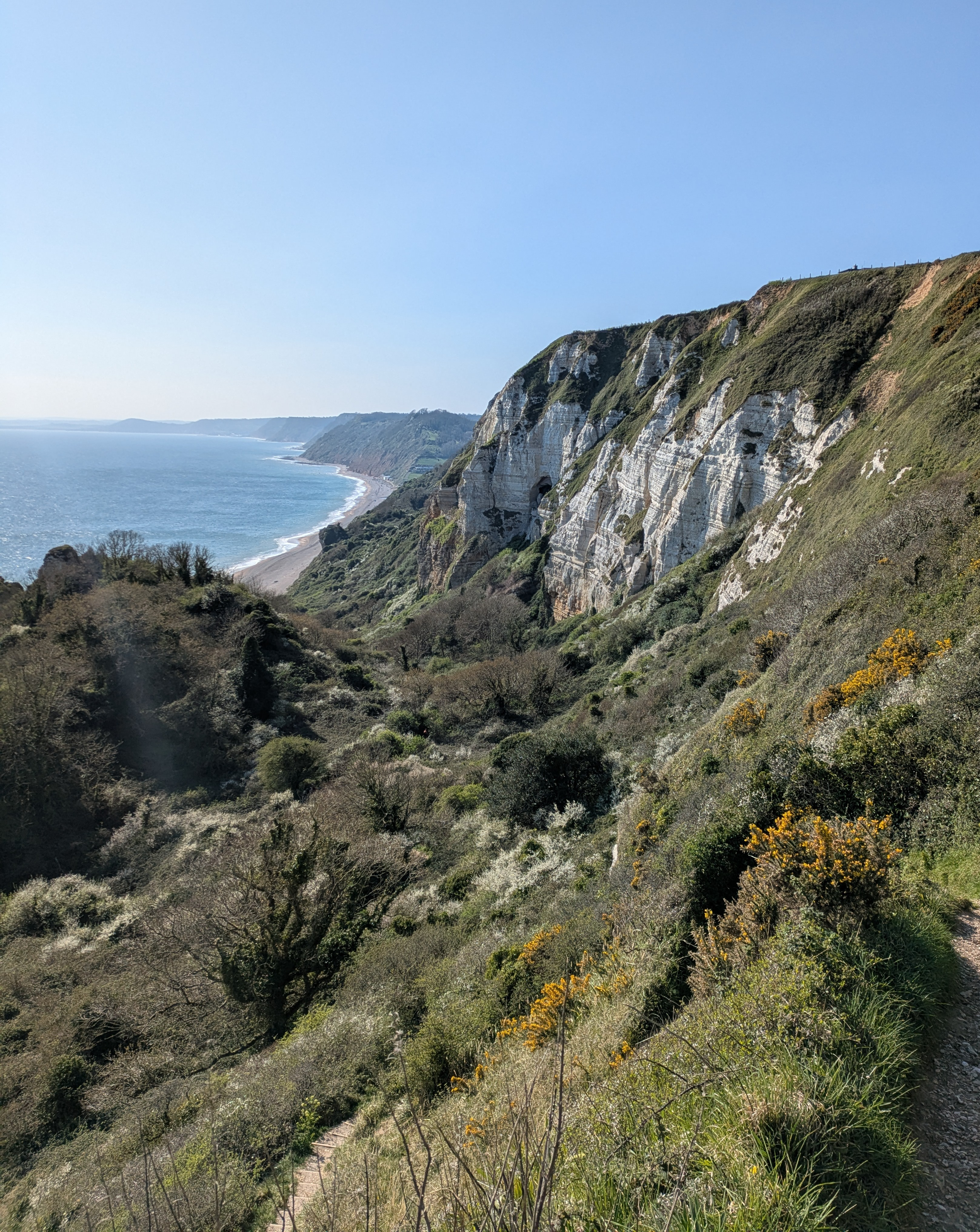
View of the Hooken undercliff between Beer and Branscombe.

The Hooken Undercliff is on the cliff route between Beer, Devon and Branscombe. A slump in the Chalk cliffs in 1790 separated a 10-acre (40,000 m^{2}) tract of land, now a wooded and sheltered habitat with chalk pinnacles on the seaward side. It is reached via a steep footpath leading from the clifftop to Branscombe Beach. A cave, that can be found halfway up the cliff and seen from the footpath, is thought to have been used by the infamous smuggler Jack Rattenbury.

== East Sussex ==
The Undercliff Walk from Brighton to Saltdean (a path under the Brighton to Newhaven Cliffs, a Site of Special Scientific Interest) is popular with walkers and cyclists but often closed because of rockfalls.

== Kent ==
The towns of Folkestone and Sandgate have undercliff areas formed by landslips. Folkestone Warren, since stabilised by sea defences to protect the Dover-Folkestone railway that runs at its foot, is designated a Site of Special Scientific Interest and a nature reserve.

== Undercliff wildlife ==
These sections of undercliff represent some of the most important sites in the UK for the conservation of rare beetles, bees and other invertebrates. Coastal soft cliffs and slopes support a specialised assemblage of species reliant on a historical continuity of bare ground, pioneer vegetation habitats, and freshwater seepages. Rare species entirely restricted to soft cliffs in the UK include the Cliff tiger beetle Cylindera germanica, the Chine beetle Drypta dentata, the Large mining bee Osmia xanthomelana, and Morris's Wainscot moth Chortodes morrisii morrisii.
