= Peco =

British model railway manufacturer

PECO Group of Companies

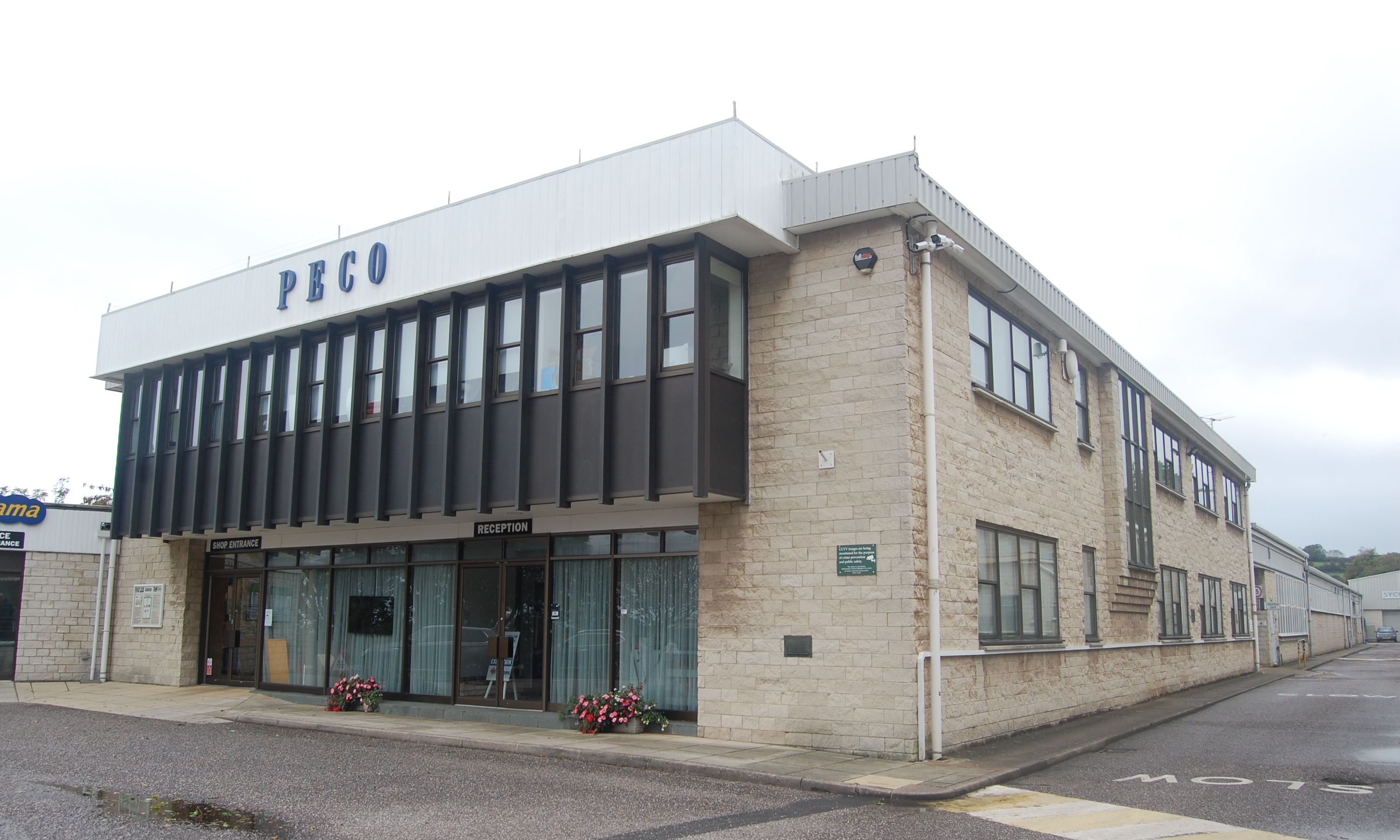
- The PECO factory at Pecorama, Beer, Devon, in 2019
- Type: Private
- Industry: Hobbies
- Founded: 1946
- Founder: Sydney Pritchard
- Headquarters: Beer, Seaton, Devon, United Kingdom
- Area served: Worldwide
- Products: Model railway products Setrack, Streamline and Individualay modular track components Model scenery
- Website: peco-uk.com

PECO is a UK-based manufacturer of model railway accessories, especially trackwork, based at Pecorama, Beer in South Devon, England.

PECO is the collective name for the Pritchard Patent Product Company Ltd, Peco Publications and Publicity Ltd, and Pecorama. Founded in 1946 by Sydney Pritchard in a small cottage, PECO now distributes its products globally.

== Products ==
The company supplies products for Z gauge, TT:120 scale, N gauge, 00 gauge, H0 gauge, 0 gauge, Gauge 1, and narrow gauge products for N6.5/Nn3, OO9, H0m, O16.5, SM32 and G scale.

The primary product ranges are its track systems. Other product lines include PECO Trackside – building kits and scenic items in gauges O, OO, TT and N – and a small range of rolling stock and locomotives, both kits and ready-to-run, for gauges N and OO9.

=== Track systems ===
There are two main types of PECO track system: PECO Set-track and PECO Streamline. Set-track consists of a range of rigid curves, straights, crossings and points (turnouts), made to the standard British geometry. It is similar to the track components supplied with train-sets, and is designed for the needs of less-experienced modellers, or those experienced modellers who do not want to spend a lot of time building trackwork. However, where part of a desired layout cannot be built using Set-track parts, Streamline components can be utilised as required.

PECO Streamline is for the more experienced modeller. The range includes a wider variety of points and crossings, at different radii. In 00 gauge it is available with a standard flat bottom rail profile and, since 2019 bullhead profile. Historically points and crossings have been available in the Electrofrog range, with live frogs, and their Insulfrog range, with plastic insulated frogs. Since 2019 Electrofrog and Insulfrog are being phased out and replaced with their Unifrog range. Unifrog points have an electrically isolated metal frog, with the option to energise it via a wire connection.

Plain track is supplied in 3 foot (914 mm) lengths (2 foot for Z gauge), to be cut to length as required. The track flexes allowing the modeller to use it for straight track or any radius curve, to suit the needs of the model. The Streamline range is supplied with different types of rail, identified by code numbers indicating the height of the rail in thousands-of-an-inch. For 00/H0 track, 'Code 100' rail is the original type, and is designed for older ready-to-run models. 'Code 83' is designed to be compatible with North American track systems. 'Code 75' is designed for 'fine-scale' models, with smaller wheel flanges, to give a more-scale appearance. TT:120 PECO Streamline track is produced with code 55 rail. N gauge Streamline track comes in code 80 and code 55.

The 00/H0 track is scaled for H0; this is commercially understandable as the product range is supplied to the smaller UK market (mainly 00) and larger European / US markets (mainly H0). The sleeper length, sleeper spacing and set-track '6 foot way' is not correct for modeling UK track in 00 gauge and this can exaggerate the error in the gauge when running 00 models.

To support the track systems, "PECOlectrics" is the company brand name for PECO's range of electronic control systems, point motors and switches.

== Wholly owned subsidiaries ==
PECO as a company owns several other well-known model companies:

- Ratio
- Wills
- Modelscene (formerly 'Merit')
- Parkside by PECO (formerly 'Parkside & Dundas')
- Harburn Hobbies, Edinburgh

== Publications ==
Peco Publications & Publicity Ltd publishes the monthly magazines Railway Modeller and Continental Modeller, as well as a large range of booklets explaining wiring, scenics, baseboard construction, outdoor railways, and similar topics.

== Pecorama ==
Pecorama was a tourist attraction, and included a display of many model railways, a shop, and the Beer Heights Light Railway.It was located in the village of Beer, Devon. In November 2025, PECO announced that Pecorama would not open as a daily visitor attraction in 2026; it has since opened on selected days for pre booked experiences.
