= Beer Quarry Caves =

Man-made caves in Devon, England

Coordinates: 50°41′56″N 3°6′46″W

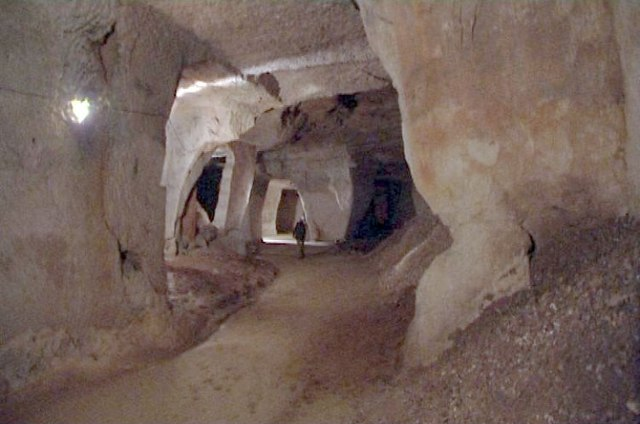
- The interior of Beer Stone Quarry
- Interactive map of Beer Quarry Caves
- Location: Beer, Devon, UK
- Geology: Limestone
- Difficulty: Easy
- Access: Public tourist attraction

Beer Quarry Caves is a man-made limestone underground complex located about a mile west of the village of Beer, Devon, and the main source in England for Beer stone. The tunnels resulted from 2,000 years of quarrying Beer stone, which was particularly favoured for cathedral and church features such as door and window surrounds because of its colour and workability for carving. Stone from the quarry was used in the construction of several of southern England's ancient cathedrals and a number of other important buildings as well as for many town and village churches, and for some buildings in the United States. Extraction was particularly intense during the Middle Ages, but continued until the 1920s. An adit to another set of workings can be seen from the South West Coast Path east of Branscombe, having been exposed by a landslip in the late 18th century. The quarry is part of the Jurassic Coast, and is a Site of Special Scientific Interest (SSSI).

== Beer stone ==
Beer stone is a creamy-grey, fine-textured limestone from the Middle Cretaceous period that takes its name from the town of Beer, where it was quarried and mined from Roman times. The layer of the best stone (lowest number of flints) is about thirty feet thick. It is also found in other places in south-west England. Because of its fine grain, it is a "Free stone", which means that it can be sawed or squared up in any direction: the crystal structure does not restrict the directions in which it can be worked. When first mined, it is relatively soft and easily cut, but it hardens with exposure to the air, and becomes about as hard as Portland stone.

== Roman period ==
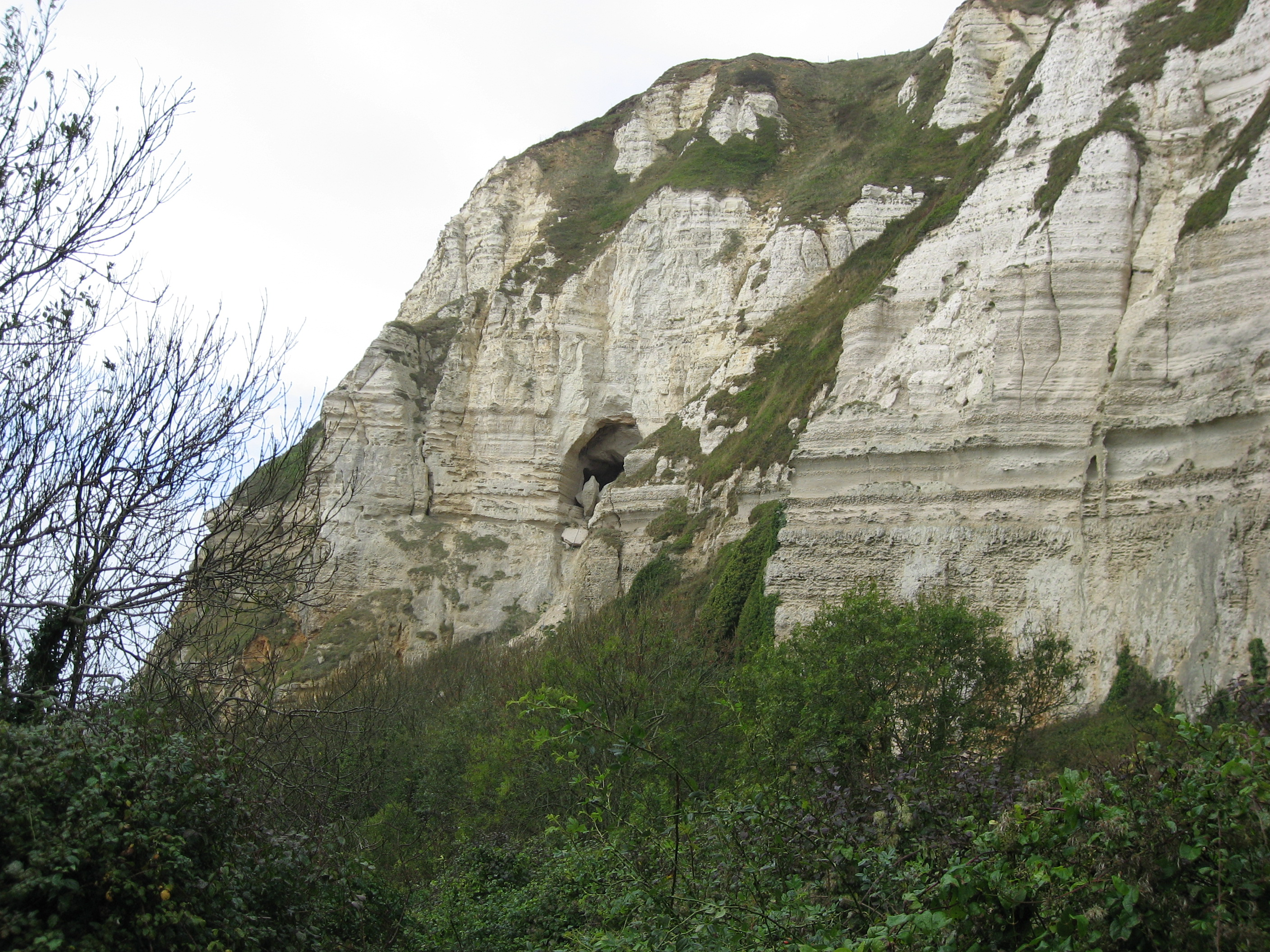
Cliffs east of Branscombe, Devon, showing an adit to Beer Stone workings

The earliest workings at the quarry were in the Roman period initially in open quarries, after which it was necessary to quarry into the side of the hill because of other rock strata above. At this time the estuary of the River Axe provided a safe harbour for the removal of the stone by boat. The Roman section is typified by large arches which support the roof and was hand excavated using picks and wooden wedges. Beer stone was used in the Roman villa of Honeyditches, Seaton.

== Norman period ==
The Norman workings join directly onto the earlier Roman quarry, working deeper into the hillside, and are typified by large rectangular columns which support the roof and includes several smaller side galleries.

== Medieval period ==
Quarry men worked long hours by candlelight with hand tools such as picks and saws. The quarrymen were also often supported by child labour. Skilled stonemasons would then work on the stone in the quarries because it became harder to carve when exposed to the air. The stone blocks would then be lifted by hand-operated cranes after the connection of Lewis lifting devices to be loaded onto horse-drawn wagons. They would then usually be taken to barges which would sail from Beer Beach. After 1540, stone was only quarried for secular building.

== Modern period ==
After the Reformation, one of the uses of the quarries was as a secret Catholic church. In the 19th century, the quarries were also used to store contraband, including by the smuggler Jack Rattenbury.

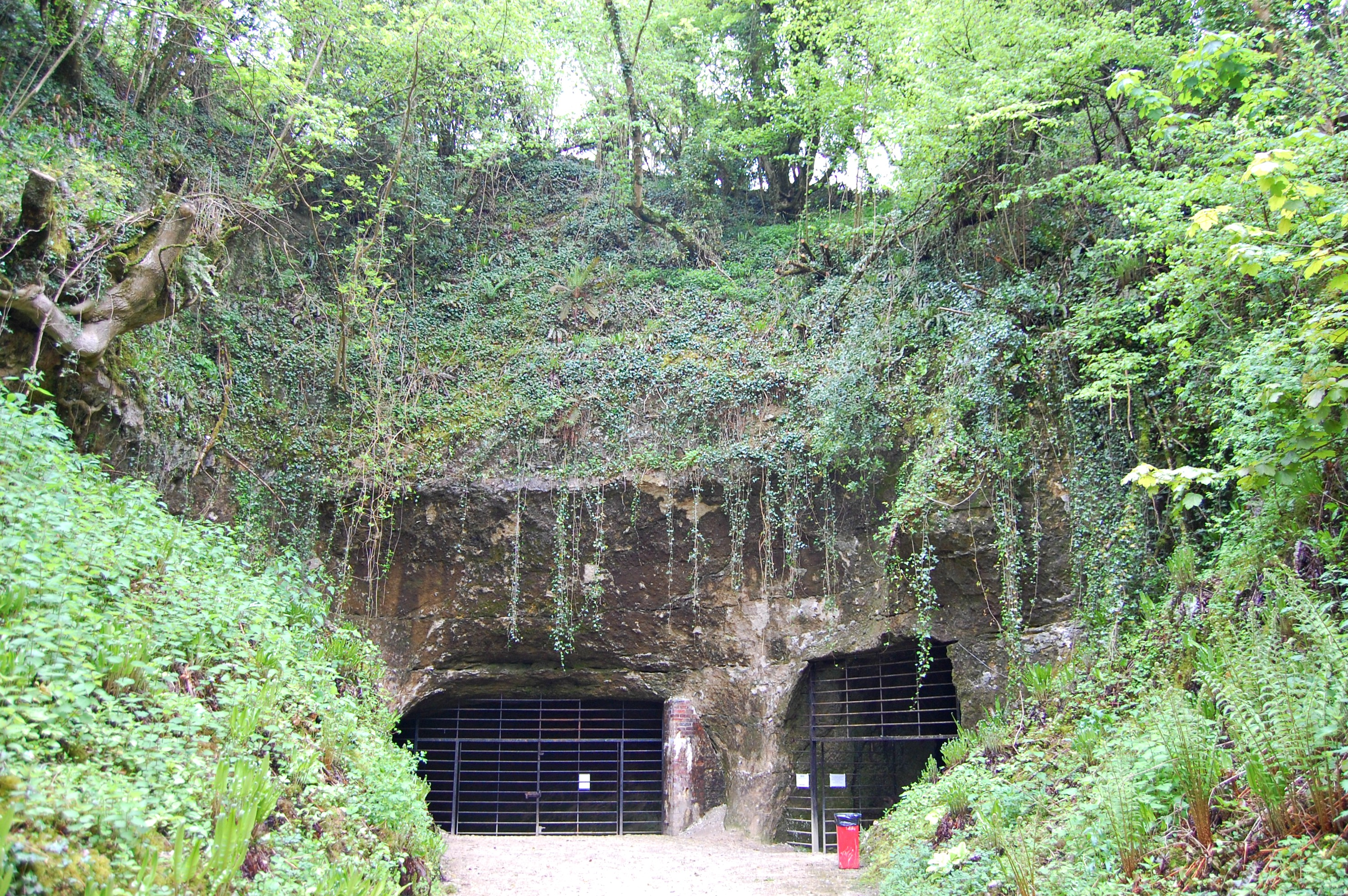
Entrance to the quarries

Quarrying at the site ceased in the early 20th century when a new quarry was opened nearby. Some quarries were then used to cultivate mushrooms and others were used to dump waste from the new quarry. Guided tours of the quarries are now run from spring to autumn. The quarries provide a haven for hibernating bats in winter. The presence of the bats, along with the opportunities to see the geological profiles that quarry faces allow, caused the old and new quarries to be declared a Site of Special Scientific Interest. The very rare Bechstein's bat and the greater and lesser horseshoe bats along with five other bat species are all found in the quarries.

The caves feature in the 2026 fantasy film Masters of the Universe.

== Notable buildings made with beer stone ==
- Christ Church Cathedral (St. Louis, Missouri)
- Exeter Cathedral
- London Bridge
- Peak House, Sidmouth
- Rochester Castle
- St Paul's Cathedral
- Westminster Abbey
- Windsor Castle
- Winchester Cathedral
- St John the Baptist Cathedral, Norwich

== See also ==
- List of Sites of Special Scientific Interest in Devon
- Pecorama Pleasure Gardens and the Beer Heights Light Railway
- Kőbánya cellar system
- Mines of Paris
- Odessa Catacombs
- Caves of Maastricht
