= The Spittles =

Cliffs in Dorset, England

Coordinates: 50.732°N 2.920°W

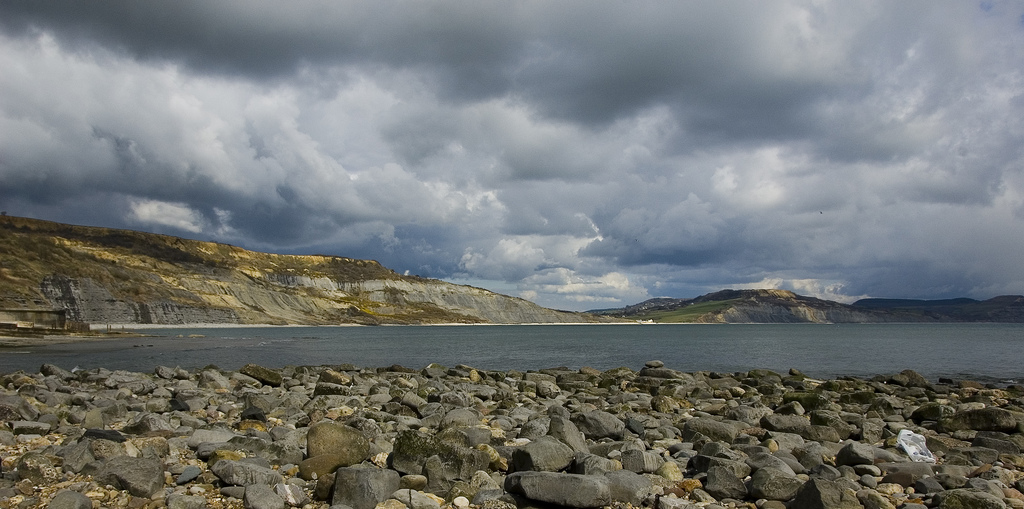
A part of Lyme Bay, with The Spittles and Black Ven on the left.

The Spittles is an area of coastal cliff in the county of Dorset on the south coast of England. It is situated between the settlements of Lyme Regis to the west and Charmouth to the east. It forms part of the Jurassic Coast, a World Heritage Site designated in 2001. The cliff contains layers of Blue Lias and clay; in wet seasons the clay causes the layers above to become saturated and hence landslips occur, exposing many fossils. Mary Anning famously found an Ichthyosaurus in the Spittles.

The Spittles also lies just to the west of another popular fossiling location along the Jurassic Coastline at Black Ven. The base of the Black Ven mudslide is one of the best places to find fossils along the Jurassic Coastline. The sea washes the fossils out of the mud and leaves them to be found amongst the shingle between the boulders.

It is possible to walk here from Lyme Regis, but care must be taken not to get cut off by the tide. The area is also prone to rock falls and mudslides, particularly during winter storms.

== See also ==
- Geology of Dorset
