= The Old Bakery, Manor Mill & Forge =

Historic buildings in Branscombe, Devon, England

Coordinates: 50.6922°N 3.1379°W

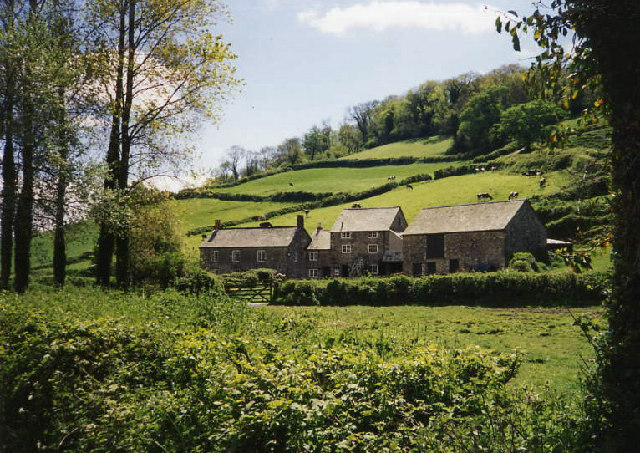
Branscombe Manor Mill

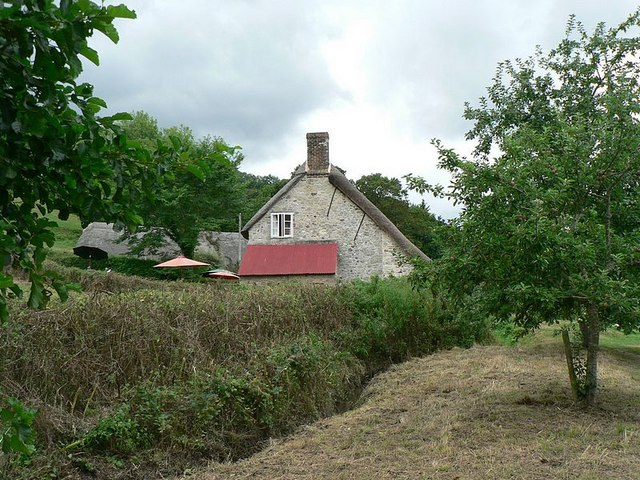
Old Bakery, Branscombe

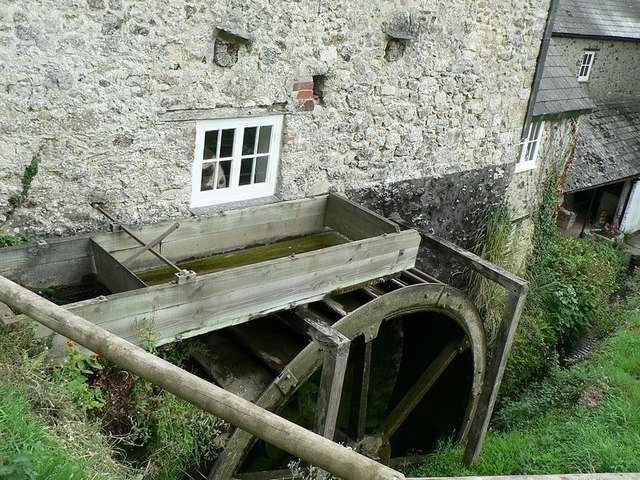
Manor Mill water wheel

The Old Bakery, Manor Mill & Forge is a collection of buildings in Branscombe, Seaton, Devon, England. The property has been in the ownership of the National Trust since 1965.

The property consists of three buildings: a bakery, a watermill and a forge.

The Old Bakery is a stone-built and partially rendered thatched building. It was the last traditional working bakery in the county when it closed its doors in 1987. The old baking equipment has been preserved in the baking room and the rest of the building now serves as a tea room.

The water-powered Manor Mill probably supplied the flour for the bakery. The mill has recently been restored and is now in full working order.

The Forge is the only thatched forge surviving in England. The blacksmith sells the ironwork he produces.
