= Stonebarrow =

Cliff in Dorset, England

Stonebarrow is a coastal hill and sea cliff in the county of Dorset on the south coast of England. It is a well known fossil hunting location, close to the coastal village of Charmouth.

== Geography ==
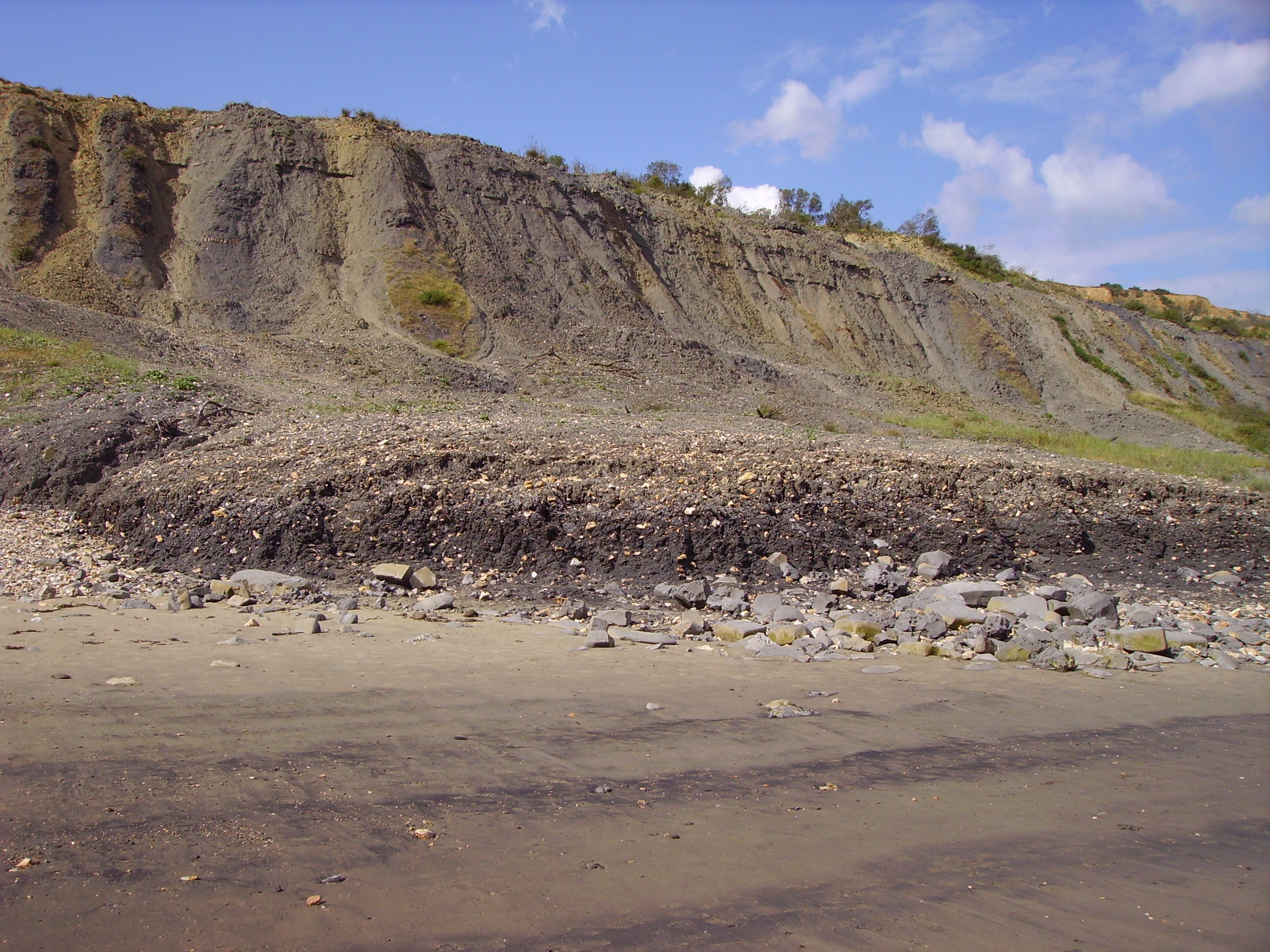
An example of rock falls in the Lyme Bay area.

Stonebarrow is located about 1 mile (1.6 km) east of Charmouth and 2 miles (3.2 km) west of the hamlet of Seatown. Stonebarrow Hill reaches an elevation of about 155 metres. The cliff face, part of which is known as Cain's Folly, is about 140 metres high, which is about 50 metres lower than the neighbouring Golden Cap, the highest cliff on the South Coast of England. Rock falls occur on the cliff face very frequently, continually exposing new fossils. There are a couple of examples of biological weathering, especially on the sandy-soils on lower-lying cliffs.

== Geology ==
The Stonebarrow cliffs are of Jurassic age, becoming geologically younger further east (the rocks of Golden Cap are early Cretaceous). The bottom of Stonebarrow is home to the Black Ven Marls a layer of rocks similar to those of Black Ven. Slightly higher are the Belemnite Marls, where a number of belemnites can be found. Slightly higher up is the Green Ammonite beds, where fossils of a species of ammonite exist. Higher still are Eype Clay, Upper Greensand and younger Cretaceous rocks.

== See also ==
- Geology of Dorset
- Lyme Regis
