= John Rattenbury =

John Rattenbury can refer to:

- Jack Rattenbury (1806–1844), Devon smuggler
- John Ernest Rattenbury (1870–1963), Methodist Minister
- John Rattenbury (architect) (1928-2021), principal architect and planner for Taliesin Architects
