= Pecorama =

Tourist attraction in England

Coordinates: 50.69687°N 3.10215°W

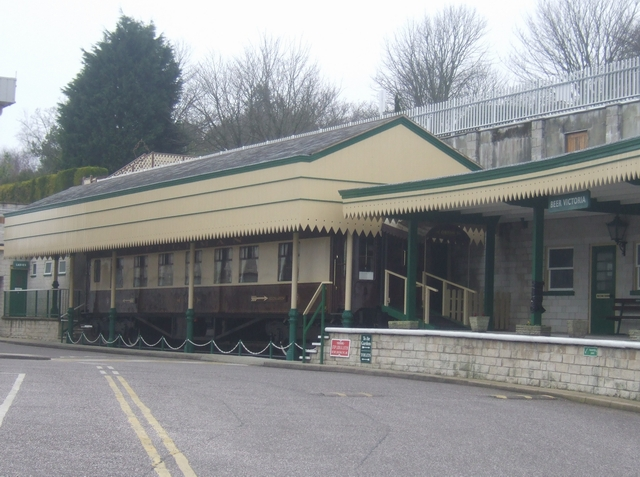
View at the entrance to Pecorama, including a restored Golden Arrow train Pullman railway carriage.

Pecorama (or Pecorama Pleasure Gardens) is a tourist attraction on the hillside above the village of Beer, Devon, in southwest England. In November 2025, the owners PECO announced that the attraction would close as a traditional daily visitor attraction for the 2026 season, citing falling revenues and a lack of profits despite a busy year in 2025. Pecorama subsequently resumed operations in 2026 through selected opening days and special events. Earlier in the year, these included Beer Heights Light Railway Gala events followed by a series of General Admission days, with visitors able to enjoy the Beer Heights Light Railway, Pecorama Gardens and Model Railway Exhibition. Further selected opening days have also been held during 2026.

The attraction is owned and operated by PECO, a UK-based manufacturer of model railway products. PECO's manufacturing operations are based on the same site.

Pecorama was also home to "Teddy Mac and the Railway Bears", a series of children's books written by Margaret Edmonds.

== Beer Heights Light Railway ==
Beer Heights Light Railway
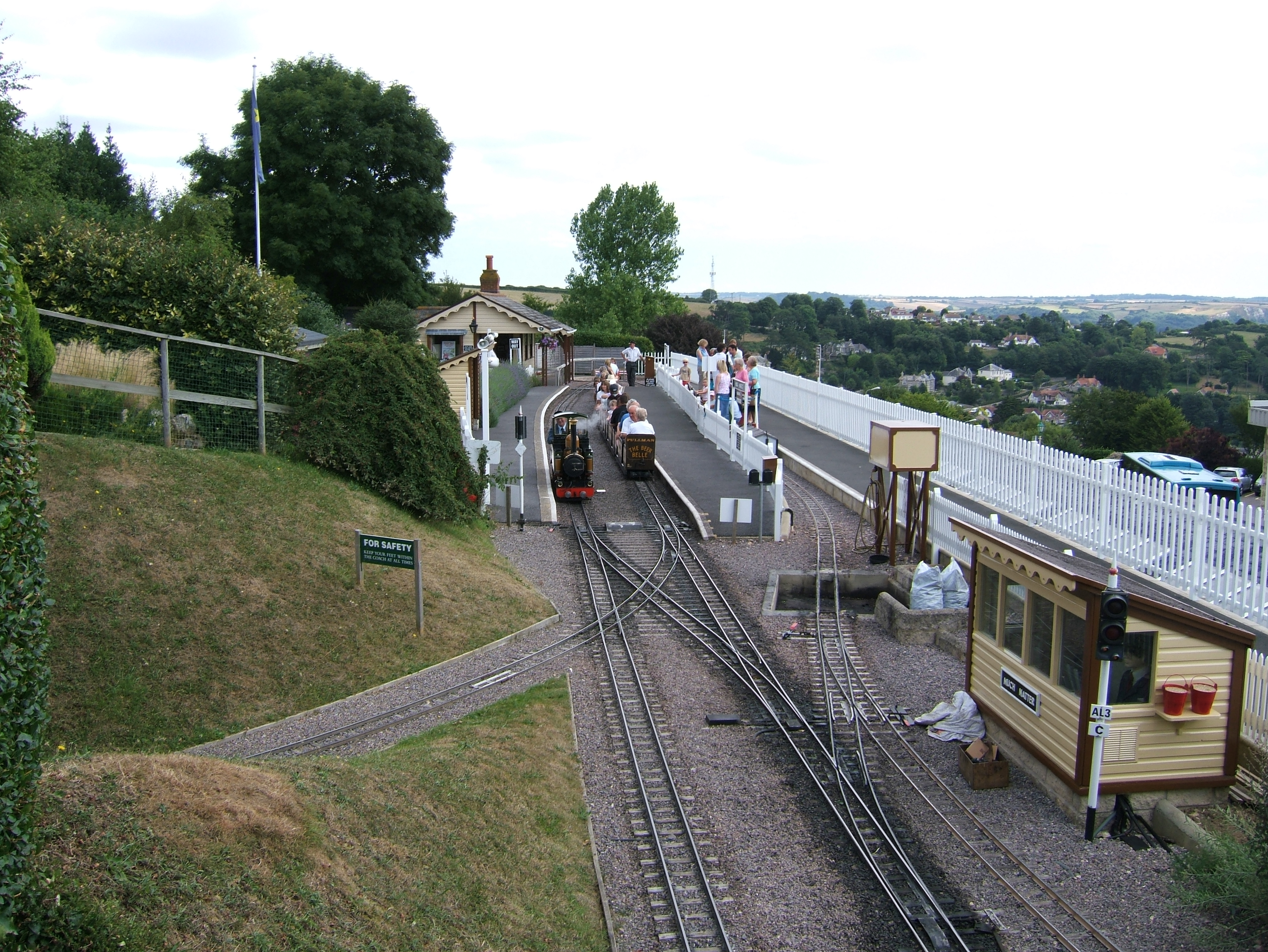
- Steam locomotive 'Claudine' running round its train at the terminus.

Overview
- Dates of operation: 14 July 1975–

Technical
- Track gauge: 7 1/4 in (184 mm)
- Length: 1 mile (1.6 km)

The Beer Heights Light Railway is a 1 mile (1.6 km) minimum-gauge 7 1/4 in (184 mm) railway. Part of Pecorama, the railway opened on 14 July 1975 and continues to operate during selected opening days and special events.

=== Overview ===
The official opening was by Rev. W.V. Awdry on 14 July 1975, at which time it offered a return ride from "Much Natter" station via a balloon loop. Subsequently, it was almost doubled in length by construction of the "Devil's Gorge" extension which involved a very considerable cutting and tunnel, and the complex track layout also includes a steeply-graded branch line to "Wildway Down". The station at Deepwater was revamped in late 2014 and reopened in July 2015 as 'Deepwater Halt'.

The line is notable for its high standard of presentation to the public and for the fine views obtainable from it. The railway operates live steam locomotives designed on narrow-gauge principles.

Following the decision to close Pecorama as a traditional daily visitor attraction for the 2026 season, the railway resumed operations through selected opening days and special events during 2026. These included Beer Heights Light Railway Gala events and General Admission days, with visitors able to ride the railway and access the Pecorama Gardens and Model Railway Exhibition.

Alongside selected opening days and special events, Pecorama continues to offer pre-booked Tours and Experiences. These provide opportunities to discover more about PECO and its model railway heritage, go behind the scenes and take part in railway and modelling experiences.

=== Locomotives ===
During its operation, the railway had eight steam locomotives, two diesel locomotives and one electric locomotive. A locomotive called 'Finn MacCool' also visited during the summer season, usually between July and September, from the Belfast and County Down Miniature Railway Society, Northern Ireland, to help during the peak season. Other locomotives also visited during the 'Loco Week' and 'Bank Holiday Weekend Gala' in August. A list of locomotives is below:

Number	Name	Wheel Arrangement	Notes	Power source	Arrived	Image
3	Dickie	0-4-2+T	Built by David Curwen, Wiltshire	Steam	1976	
4	Thomas II	0-4-2ST+T	Thomas II (Original), Built by Roger Marsh	Steam	1979	
5	Linda	2-4-0ST+T	Mainline Hunslet, rebuilt by TMA Engineering, Birmingham. Replica of Ffestiniog Loco.	Steam	1983	
6	Jimmy	Bo-Bo	Built Severn Lamb, Stratford-On-Avon	diesel hydraulic	1986	
7	Mr.P	2-4-2T+T	Built in Beer Works	Steam	1997	
8	Gem	0-6-0+T	Romulus (heavily modified – Engerth tender arrangement)	Steam	1999	
O&EBR 1	Otter	2-4-2+T	Built at Western Steam, Privately Owned	Steam	2004	
9	Claudine	2-4-4T	Single Fairlie, Built at Beer Works	Steam	2005	
10	Alfred	Bo-Bo	Tram style, Built at Beer Works	Battery Electric	2003	
11	Ben	Bo-Bo	Freelance, Built at Beer Works	LPG / Petrol Mechanical	2015	
12	Jools	0-4-2T	Heavily rebuilt from Samastipur.	Steam	Arrived 1999, rebuild completed	2018

== See also ==
- Beer Quarry Caves
