= Richard Gush =

Richard Gush

Richard Gush (1789–1858) was an 1820 Settler. Originally from Beer, a village in Devon, England, he settled in Salem, near Grahamstown in the Eastern Cape Province of South Africa. His parents were Thomas and Mary Gush and his grandparents were James and Agnes (née Bucknell) Gush all of whom lived in Devon.

He earned renown by saving Salem from Xhosa warriors. A devout Quaker, he rode to meet them unarmed. After negotiating with Gush, they never attacked the village again, having previously stolen cattle.

These events inspired Guy Butler to write Richard Gush of Salem, a play that was commissioned by the Cape Performing Arts Board in 1968 for performance in 1970 as part of the celebrations of 150th anniversary of the 1820 Settlers' arrival. It was subsequently made into a movie.

Gush was a carpenter and built Salem's first church. Only after building the church did he build his house: indeed he and his family lived in a cave for their first seven years in South Africa. Children listed on his Death Notice are Mary Hana (1813), Margaret (1815), Richard Thoma (1817), Joseph Evans (1819), Joseph (1821), Margaret (1824), Richard Thomas Grainger (1826), William (1826), John Grainger (1828) and Elizabeth Ann (1831).

A sports house at Westering High School, Port Elizabeth is named in his honour. The yearly lecture of the Southern Africa Yearly Meeting of Quakers is named the Richard Gush Lecture in his honour.
