= Jack Rattenbury =

Jack Rattenbury, nicknamed Rob Roy of the West (c. 1778, in Beer, Devon – 1844), was an English smuggler. In 1837, after thirty years at sea as a fisherman, pilot, seaman and smuggler, he wrote about his life in a book called Memoirs of a Smuggler with the help of a local Unitarian clergyman.

== Life ==
Jack Rattenbury was born in Beer in about 1778. His mother, Anne Newton, came from Beer, and his father, John Rattenbury, came from Honiton. Going to sea from the age of nine, Jack Rattenbury first became involved in smuggling at the age of sixteen. In 1800 he married Anna Partridge from Lyme Regis. He died aged sixty-five, and was buried on 28 April 1844 in Seaton churchyard, at an unmarked spot close to the north transept. (He's actually buried in Branscombe church's graveyard).

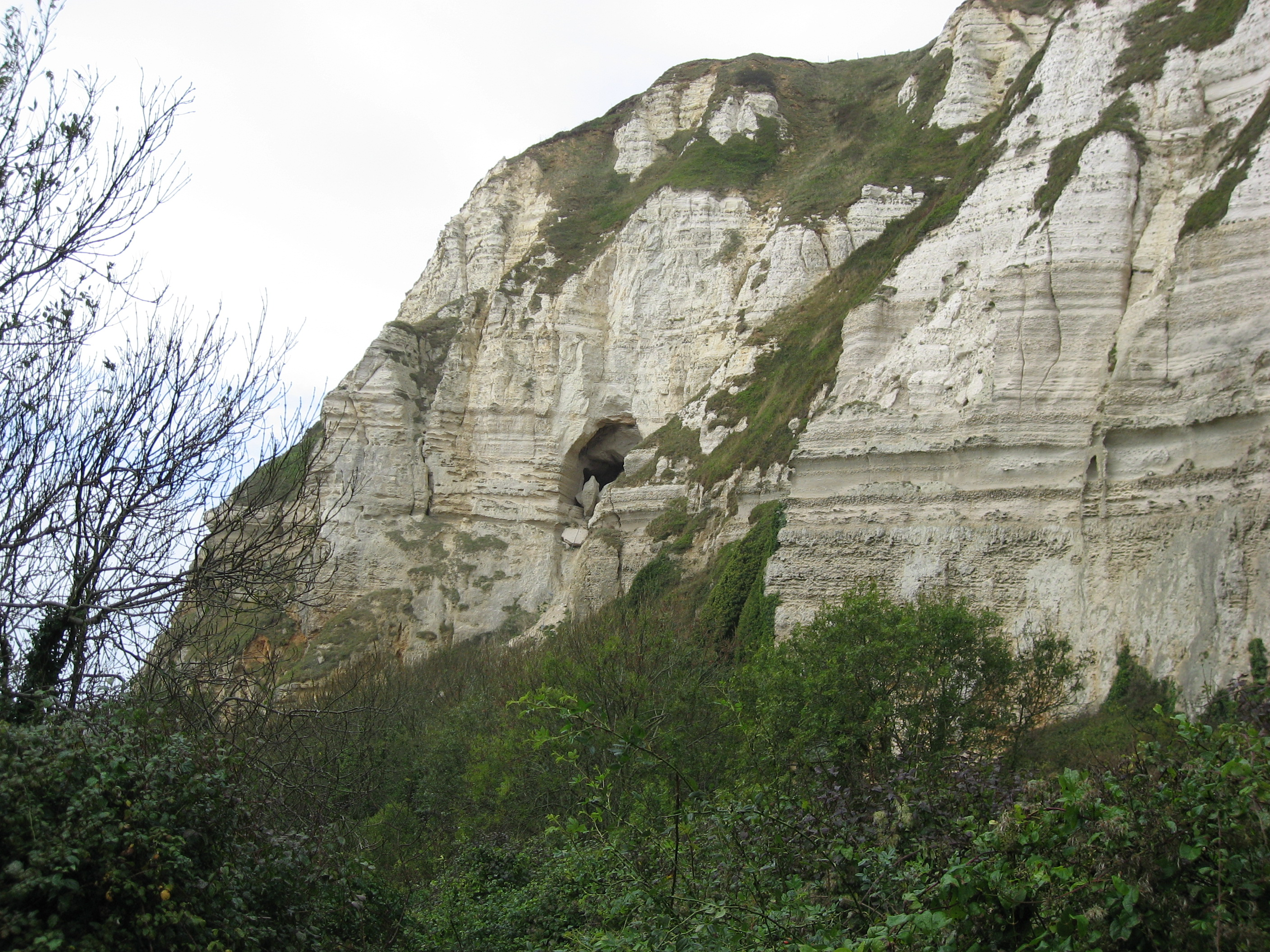
This is the Cave entrance that would connect the sea and Beer Quarry Caves,this was then the access point for the caves for storing contraband.

The Beer Quarry Caves were of great use to smugglers as they could be used to store contraband, hidden from the excise officials. One cave that was used was the Adit between Branscombe and Beer Head, located in the area known as the Hooken Undercliff. The entrance is up on the cliffs in Branscombe and local legend has it, it leads through to the church in Branscombe.

== Rattenbury in fiction ==
In 1879 Sir Walter Besant and James Rice published a book of stories, 'Twas in Trafalgar Bay, about Rattenbury. In 1900 Sabine Baring-Gould wrote a novel about him entitled Winefred: a story of the chalk cliffs. Author Mary Upton wrote a 2007 novel about him entitled Rattenbury: a novel based on the memoirs of a West Country smuggler.

== Works ==
- Memoirs of a smuggler, compiled from his diary and journal: containing the principal events in the life of John Rattenbury, of Beer, Devonshire; commonly called "The Rob Roy of the West." With a portrait, and a correct map of the coast and country twenty miles each way round Beer, Sidmouth, 1837
