= Branscombe lace =

Type of tape lace from Branscombe, Devon

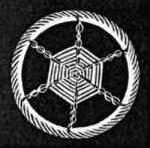
Woven spider wheel

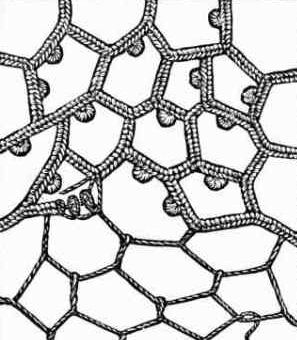
Bars decorated with nibs

Branscombe lace is a type of tape lace made in Branscombe in Devon.

It was probably introduced by John Tucker in the late 1860s as the market for Honiton lace started to decline.

Typical of Branscombe lace are the edging of buttonholed scallops, bars decorated with nibs (tiny buttonholed rings), woven spider wheels and a variety of fillings.
