= Rowland Molony =

- Born: 1946 (age 79–80)
- Occupations: Poet; novelist
- Spouse: Elizabeth Baxendale
- Children: 2

Rowland Molony (born 1946) is a British poet and novelist.

== Life ==
Molony graduated from St John's Catholic Comprehensive School Gravesend, Kent, in 1962, and joined the RAF. He spent several years in Bulawayo, Zimbabwe, where he married the artist Elizabeth Baxendale, and has two daughters. He now lives in Beer, Devon.

He is a teacher and lecturer. His love for poetry and the teaching of English Literature led to him writing three books for children, 'Temba and the Crocodile', 'The Rain Tree' (Longman) 'After the Death of Alice Bennett' (OUP) '.

== Awards ==
- 2001 Bridport First Prize
- 2010 {Bridport Second Prize}
- 2020 (Bridport Third Prize)

== Work ==
- "Hive Inspection". Arts Council England, South West. Archived from the original on 14 April 2009.
- Frogs and Co

=== Anthologies ===
- Molony, Rowland; David Wright; John Eppel; Noel Brettell (1982). Four Voices: Poetry From Zimbabwe. Books of Zimbabwe. ISBN 978-0-86920-259-3.
- Poems (with John Torrance) The Hooken Press 2009 ISBN 978-095556444-4

=== Novels ===
- After the Death of Alice Bennett. Oxford: Oxford University Press. 4 January 2007. ISBN 978-0-19-275472-1.
- Themba and the Crocodile Longman Zimbabwe 1984 ISBN 0582 - 58741 - 7
- The Raintree Longman Zimbabwe 1986 ISBN 0582 - 00370 - 9

=== Non Fiction ===
- Notes from a Clifftop Apiary and Fifteen Poems About Bees and Other Creatures. Published by Northern Bee Books, 2014.
- On Stillness. (Booklet) 2016 The Philosophy behind Meditation.
- Freedom from Self. (Booklet) 2018 A Philosophy for Living.
- Prompts (Booklet) 2020 Spiritual Philosophy.
- Peace of Mind (Booklet) 2023 Spiritual Philosophy.
- Going Through Dark Times (Booklet) 2023 Spiritual Philosophy

=== Plays ===
- Facing the Hedge
- Hard Shoulder
- Knocking on the Moonlit Door
- Mind How You Go
- The Jilly Cooper Effect
- Hitchhiker
- The Bridge

=== Interviews ===
- "John Fowles: The Magus", Dorset, the County Magazine, 30 November 1973
