= Battenberg lace =

Type of American tape lace

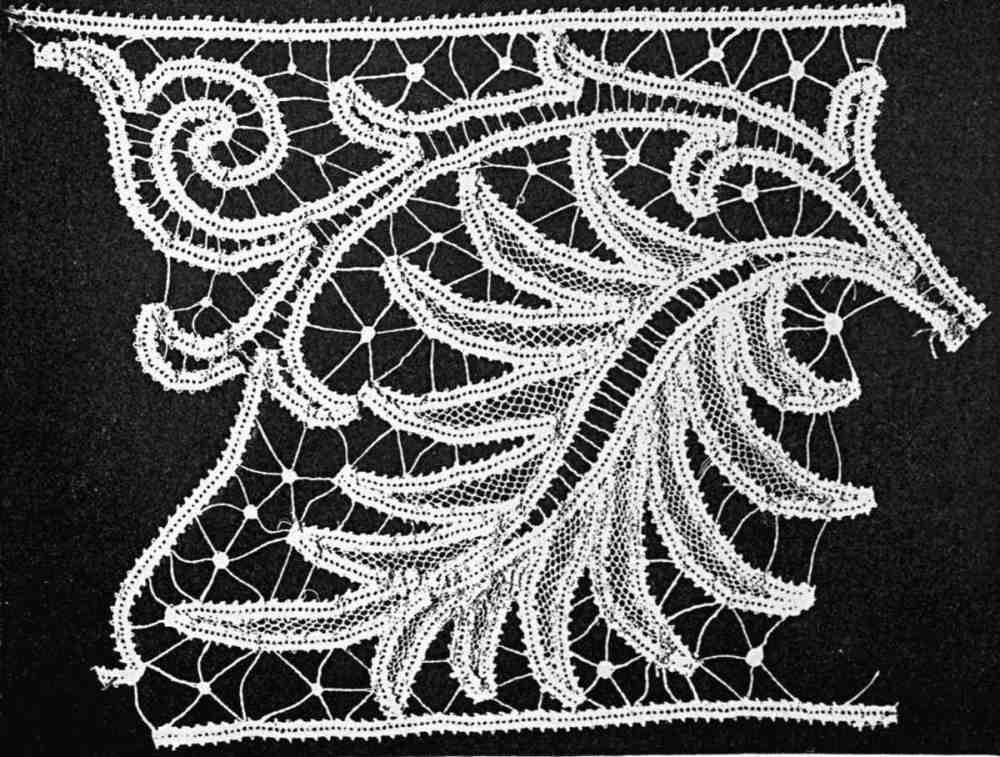
Battenberg lace

Battenberg lace is a type of tape lace. It is of American origin, designed and first made by Sara Hadley of New York. This American lace was named either in honor of the wedding of Princess Beatrice, Queen Victoria's youngest daughter, to Prince Henry of Battenberg, or from [sic] the widowed Princess Beatrice. It is made using bobbins and needles, or just needles alone.The original Battenberg lace used just one stitch: buttonhole picot. Other stitches that were later used include flat wheel (also known as spider or rosette) and rings or "buttons".

With the popularity of Battenberg lace, all tape lace (sometimes called braid lace ) was called Battenberg lace in the US. Some consider it a form of Renaissance lace, or Dentelle Renaissance, as it is still called in Belgium. Others regard Renaissance lace as a different type of tape lace. Tape laces were known in the 19th century as modern point laces, as the filling stitches were very similar to those found in true point laces. 19th-century tape laces use inexpensive machine-woven tape as the outline, and the availability of this commercial tape led to increased popularity of Battenberg lace. Originally Battenberg lace was heavier than the other machine tape laces such as Princess lace.

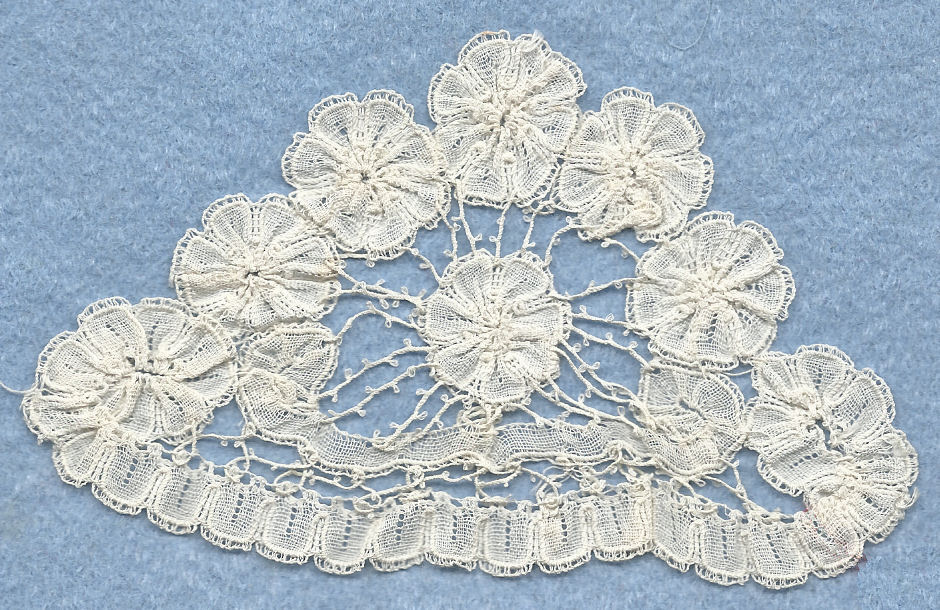
Princess lace

Battenberg lace was frequently used as an edging, and was particularly popular in the United States in the 19th century. By the end of the 1800s, a wide variety of tapes and patterns, stamped on pink or white muslin were available for purchase from companies such as Butterick, Sears, and Montgomery Ward.

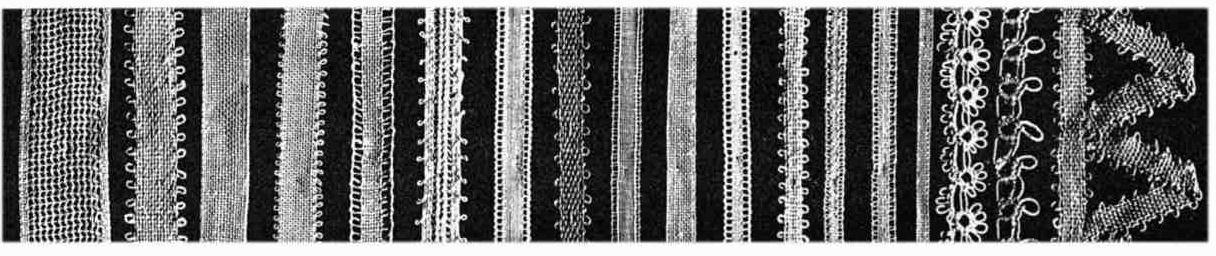
Tape for Battenberg lace
