= Black Ven =

Cliff in Dorset, England

Coordinates: 50.7342°N 2.9107°W

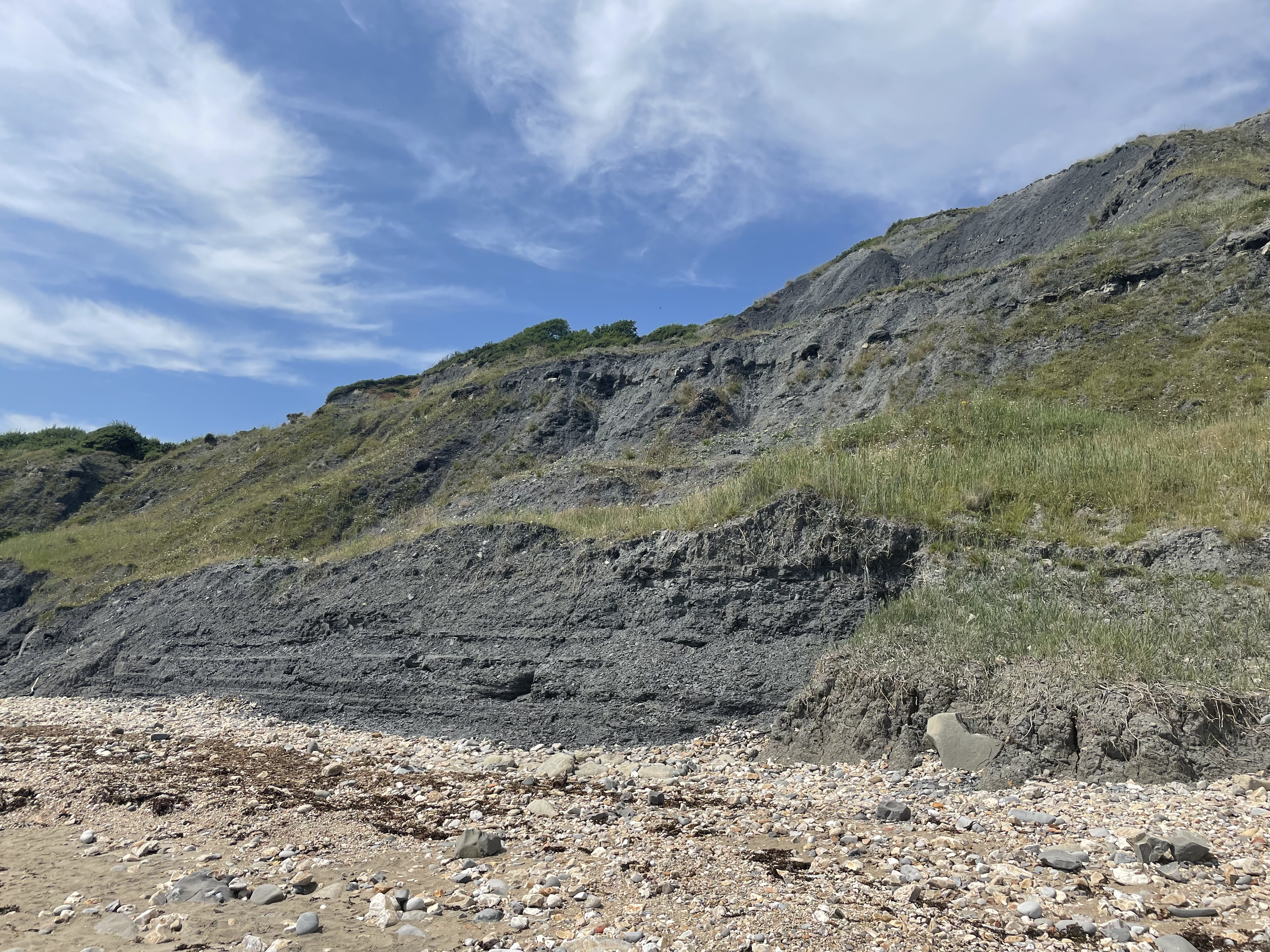
Black Ven in 2021

Black Ven is a cliff in Dorset, England between the towns of Charmouth and Lyme Regis. The cliffs reach a height of 130 metres (430 ft). It is part of the Jurassic Coast World Heritage Site. Nearby is an undercliff with an ammonite pavement. The area is popular with tourists due to a number of fossils being found in the area.

== History ==
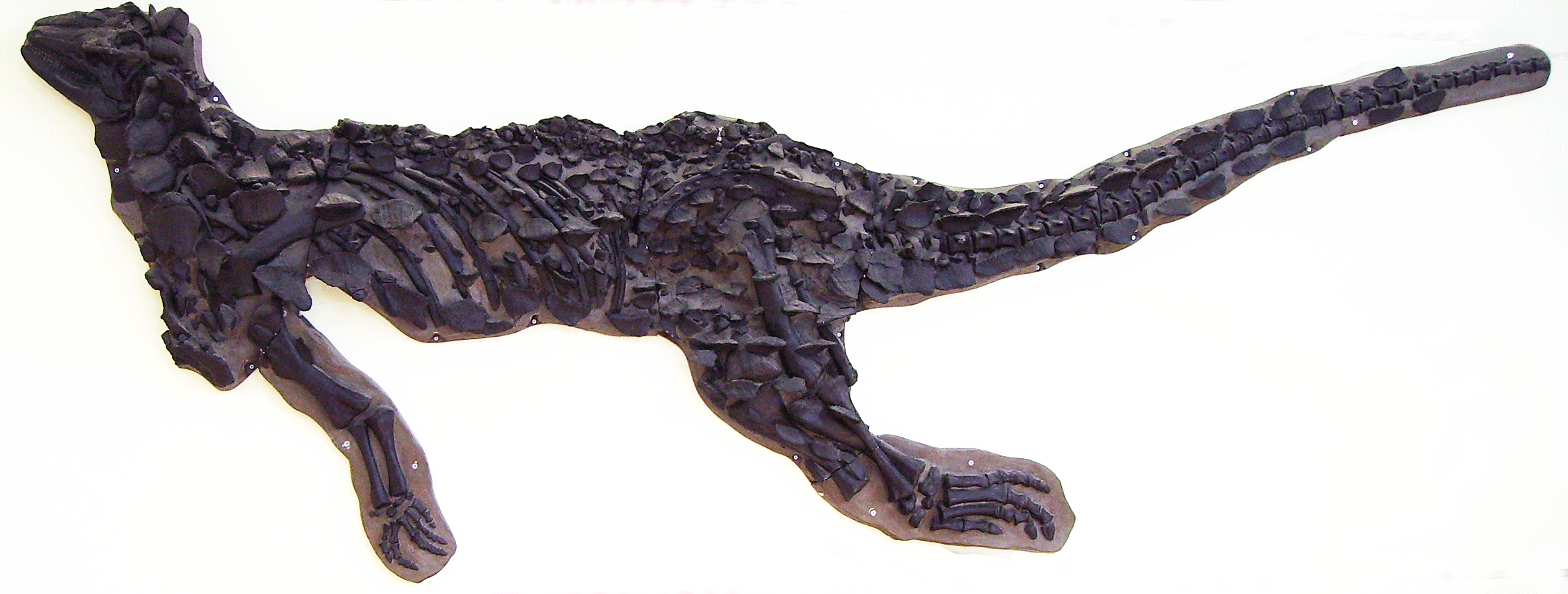
Fossil Scelidosaurus in the Charmouth Heritage Coast Centre

The Black Ven has been historically renowned for paleontology. Mary Anning found an ichthyosaurus in The Spittles, and James Harrison found the first fossil remains of a Scelidosaurus while quarrying Black Ven in 1858. In 2001, the Black Ven and the whole of Lyme Bay became part of the Jurassic Coast World Heritage Site.

== Geology ==
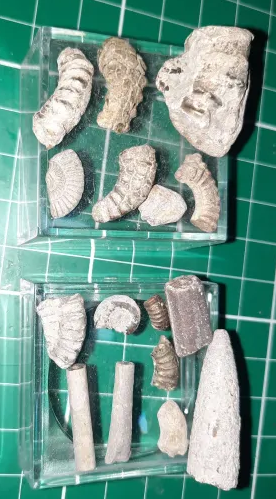
An assortment of fossils discovered along the Black Ven in 2023

Black Ven has the largest mudslides in Europe, and this constantly brings new material (such as fossils) to the base of the cliff and beach. The reason for this is the types of stone found through the cliff. There is porous limestone, which lets the water on rough days flow through it, below which you will find clay, which lets water in, but not out. When the clay becomes saturated, it becomes very slippery and the limestone above can slide off in large chunks. Black Ven for this reason is a famous fossil hunting location, although the mudslides can be surprisingly damaging to the fossils, especially to soft parts such as scales. The Black Ven has a layer called Blue Lias where famous fossilised fish are known to be found. The geological dating of the rocks of the whole of the area (Lyme Bay) is Jurassic. The Black Ven and the Spittles contain rocks from the lower (early) Jurassic. Ammonites, Belemnites, and the occasional Devil's toenail are common finds in this area.

== Incidents ==
On 26 March 1975, Lyme Regis resident Mary Byass, aged 63, disappeared in the local area while walking her two dogs. The alarm was raised by her husband after both dogs returned home hours later without her, dishevelled and covered in mud. Despite searches conducted by the police, with assistance from the Junior Leaders of Bovington Camp, the Women's Royal Voluntary Service, and helicopters from RN Air Station Portland, Byass was never found. The police later concluded that she may have died after becoming stuck in soft mud at Black Ven.

== See also ==
- Geology of Dorset
