= Beer, Devon =

Village in Devon, England

Coordinates: 50.698°N 3.093°W

Beer
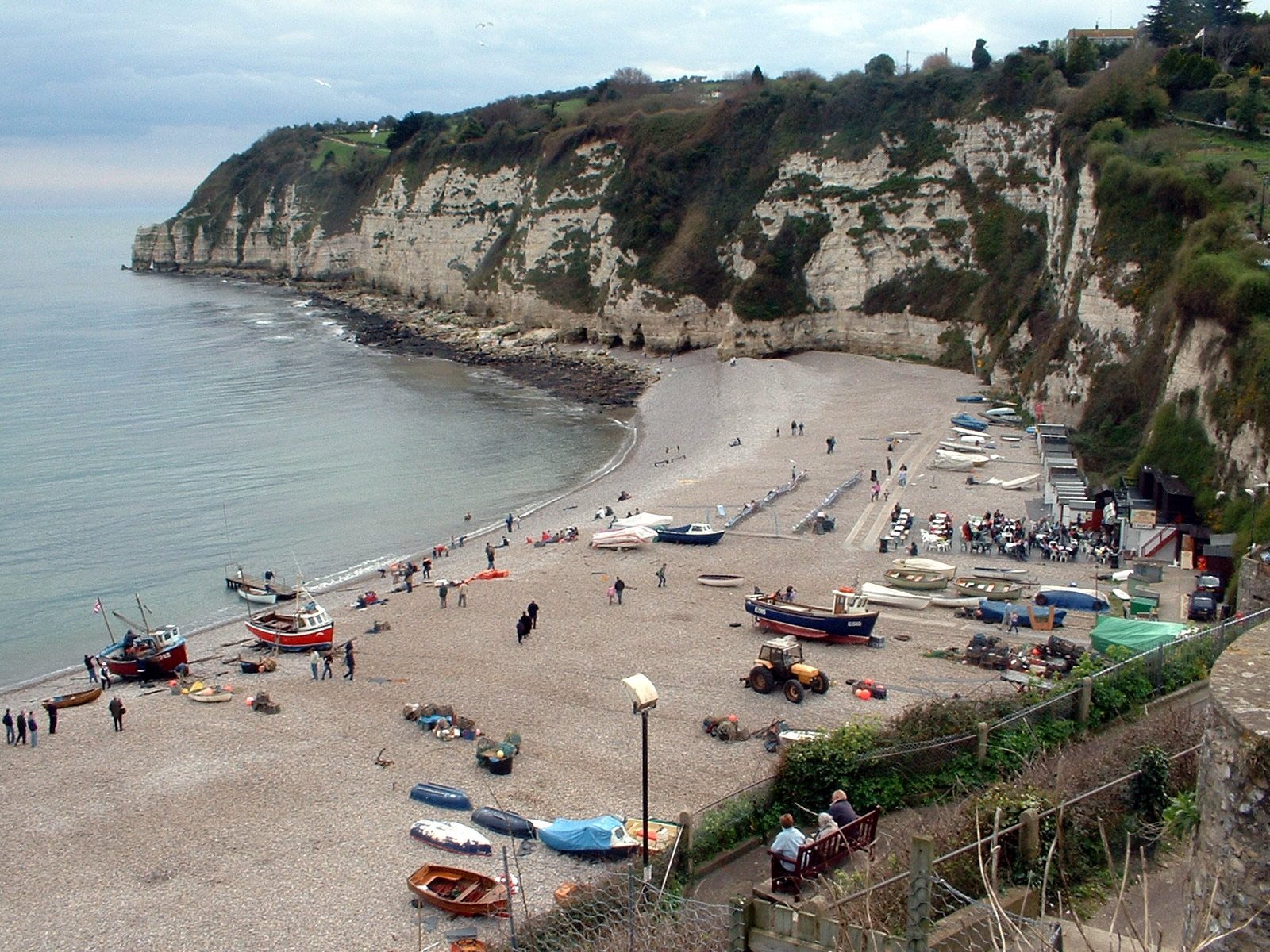
- Beach at Beer, with Beer Head behind (April 2006)

- Location within Devon
- Area: 6.7 km^{2} (2.6 sq mi)
- Population: 1,317 (2011)
  - Density: 197/km^{2} (510/sq mi)
- OS grid reference: SY2289
- Civil parish: Beer
- District: East Devon
- Shire county: Devon
- Region: South West
- Country: England
- Sovereign state: United Kingdom
- Post town: SEATON
- Postcode district: EX12
- Dialling code: 01297
- Police: Devon and Cornwall
- Fire: Devon and Somerset
- Ambulance: South Western
- UK Parliament: Honiton and Sidmouth

Beer is a seaside village and civil parish in the East Devon district of Devon, England. The village faces Lyme Bay and is a little over 1 mile (1.6 km) west of the town of Seaton. It is situated on the Jurassic Coast World Heritage Site and its picturesque cliffs, including Beer Head, form part of the South West Coast Path.

At the 2021 Census, the parish had a population of 1,283.

== History ==
Beer is mentioned in the Domesday Book of 1086, at which time it was located within Colyton hundred and had 28 households. Its name is not derived from the drink, but from the Old English word bearu, meaning "grove" and referring to the original forestation that surrounded the village.

It is a coastal village that grew up around a smugglers' cove and caves which were once used to store contraband goods. These are now part of the attraction of the village.

Beer is home to a cave complex, the Beer Quarry Caves, resulting from the quarrying of Beer stone. This stone has been prized since Roman times, because of its workability for carving and for its gentle yellow colour on exposure to air. Beer stone was used in the construction of 24 cathedrals around the UK, including Exeter Cathedral, Westminster Abbey and St. Paul's Cathedral, and was also used in the building of Christ Church Cathedral, Missouri.

Bovey House, an Elizabethan manor house, is a mile inland.

Historically, the main sources of income for the village included fishing and lace production.

Bacteria taken from cliffs at Beer on the south coast were launched to the International Space Station in 2008. The Beer microbes were placed on the European Space Agency's (ESA) Technology Exposure Facility and were sent up still sitting on, and in, small chunks of cliff rock from the Jurassic Coast. After 553-days scientists found that many were still alive. The survivors are now reproducing in a laboratory. This was part of an experiment to study the survival of microbes (which naturally live on the stone) in extreme conditions. A new species of cyanobacteria was isolated at the Open University that could be used in future space settlements on the Moon and Mars to produce oxygen and break down rocks.

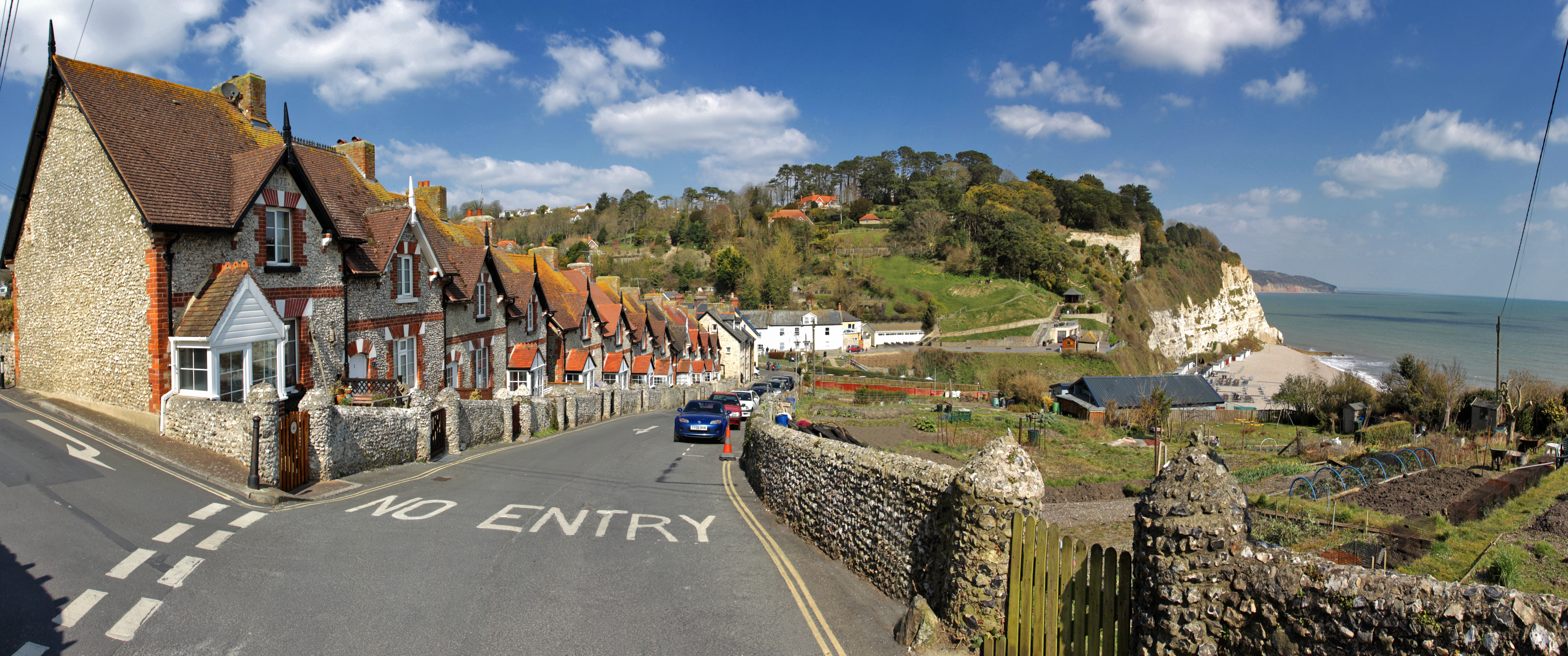
Common Lane

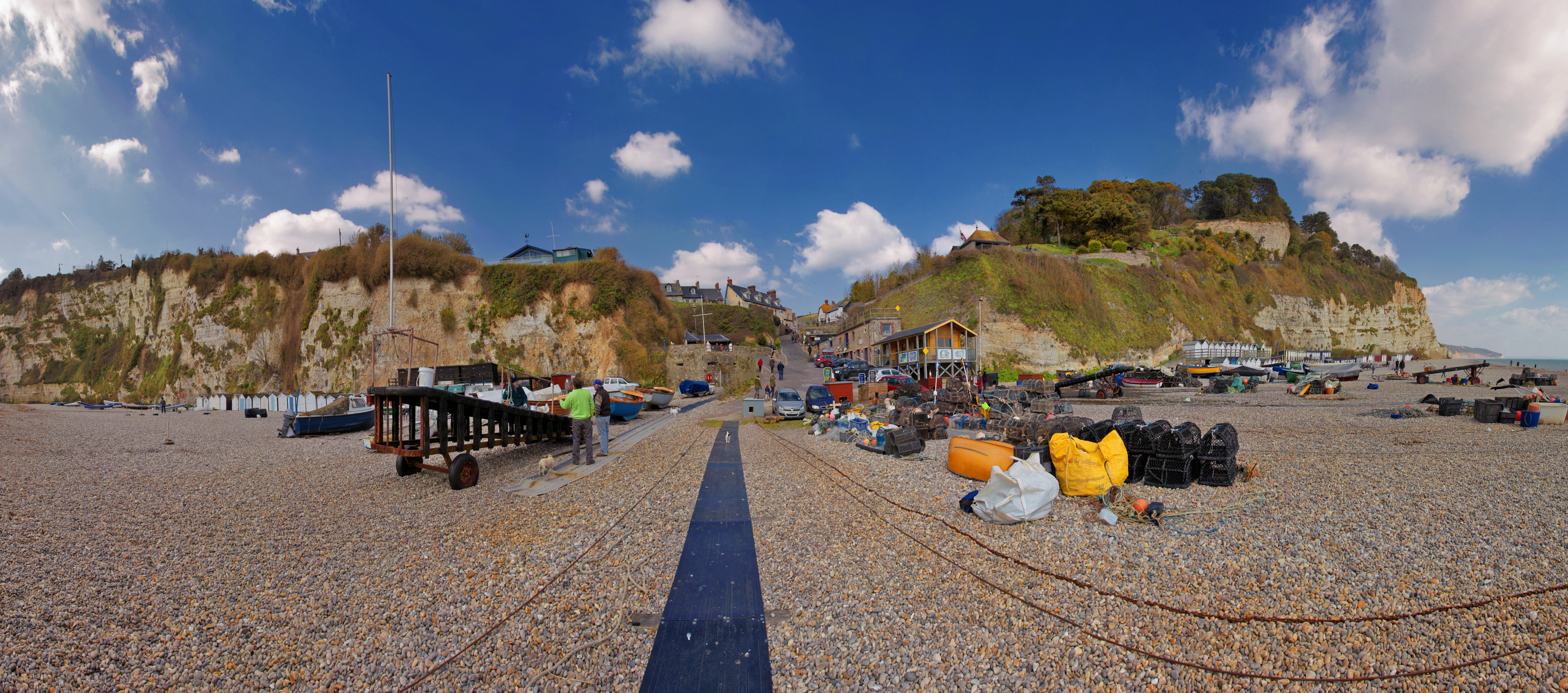
Beach

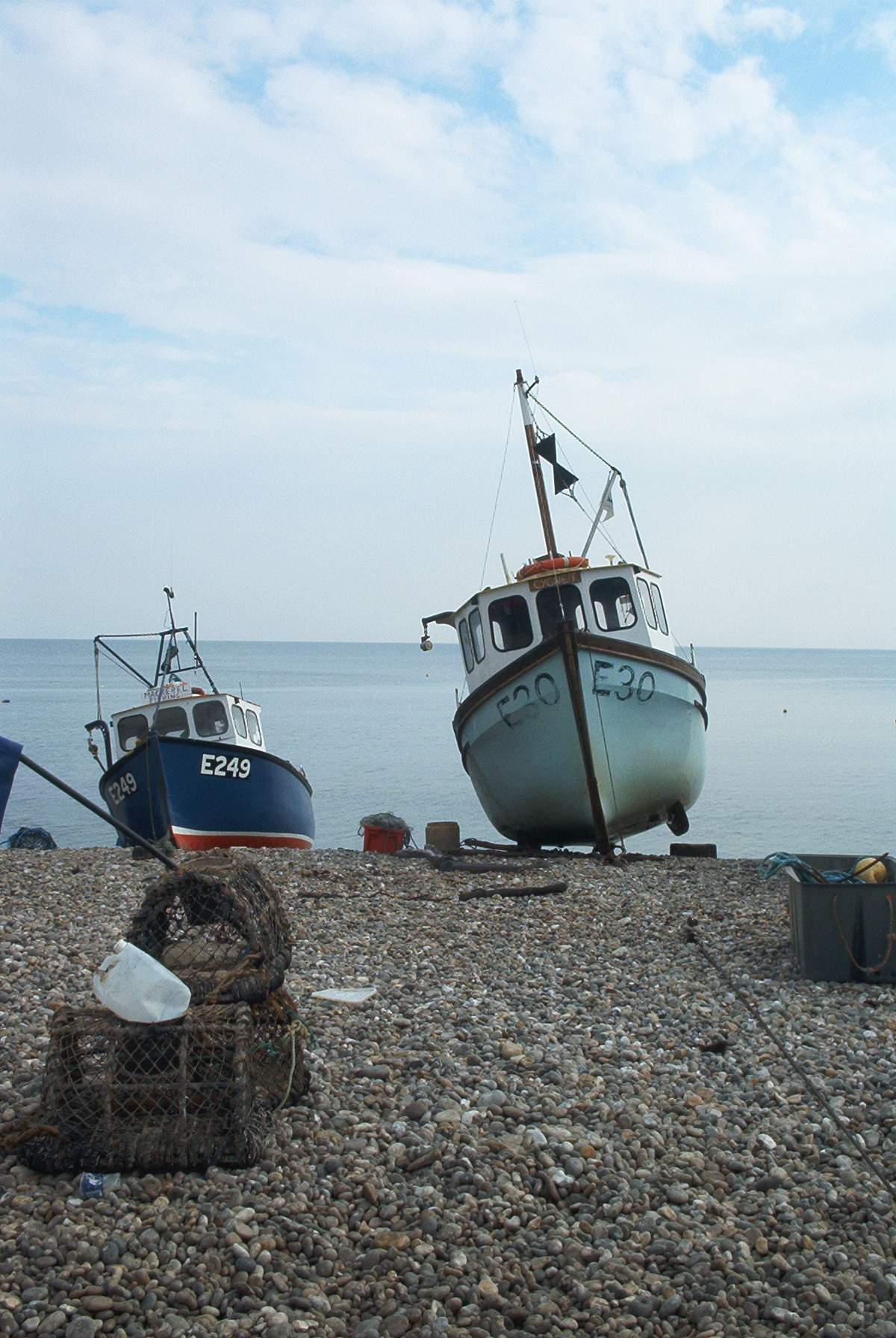
Boats beached at Beer

== Economy ==
Nowadays, the sources of income are mainly tourism and fishing. Beer was also the home of the Pecorama (run by the PECO model railway manufacturer), which closed in November 2025, and included pleasure gardens and the Beer Heights Light Railway.

The shape of the coastline allowed local seafarers to operate in weather conditions when other towns could not, because it is protected from the prevailing westerly winds by Beer Head and the chalk cliffs which are the westernmost outcrop of limestone on the southwest coast. Boats are winched up the beach as there is no harbour, and fresh fish is sold nearby. Nowadays small electrically-driven winches using steel cables or tractors are located on the beach to haul boats in. Higher up is an old manual capstan operated by up to 20 men, now disused.

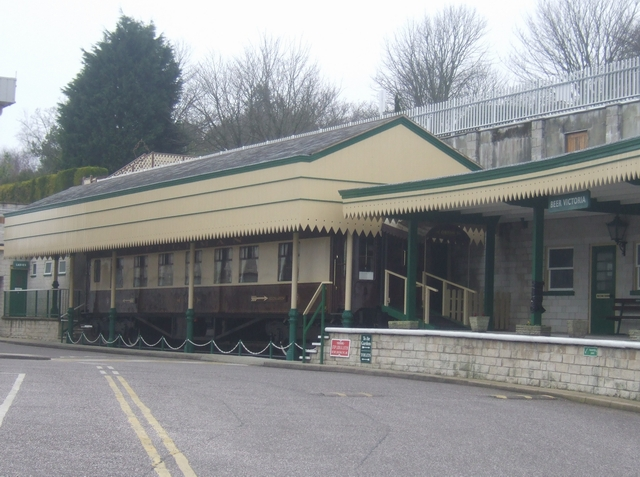
View at the entrance to the Pecorama Pleasure Gardens in Beer, including a restored Golden Arrow train Pullman railway carriage.

== Physical features ==
Many of the buildings are faced with flint, a hard glassy stone found in the local chalk rock.

A brook winds its way in an open conduit alongside the main road down to the sea.

Beer has a steep pebble beach.

== Transport ==
Beer is just off the A3052 which links Exeter to the West and Lyme Regis to the East.

Beer's nearest railway station is Axminster railway station, around 9 miles (14 km) away, which is on the Exeter to Waterloo line. There is a bus link from the rail station to Beer.

The bus services in the village are provided by locally based AVMT Buses who run services to many of the nearby towns and villages including Seaton, Axminster, Branscombe, Sidmouth, and Colyton.

== Notable people ==
- William George Aston (1841–1911), Irish diplomat and writer, died in Beer
- Frederick T. Durrant (1895–c. 1979), organist, was born in Beer
- Richard Gush (1789–1858), an 1820 Settler in South Africa, was born in Beer
- Rowland Molony (born 1946), poet and novelist, lives in Beer
- Charles William Peach (1800–1886), naturalist and geologist, lived in Beer
- Jack Rattenbury (1778–1844), smuggler, was born in Beer
- William Henry Woodgate (1827–1877), murderer, was born in Beer
- Innes FitzGerald (2006– ), athlete, was brought up in Beer
