= Branscombe =

Village in Devon, England

Coordinates: 50.689°N 3.1397°W

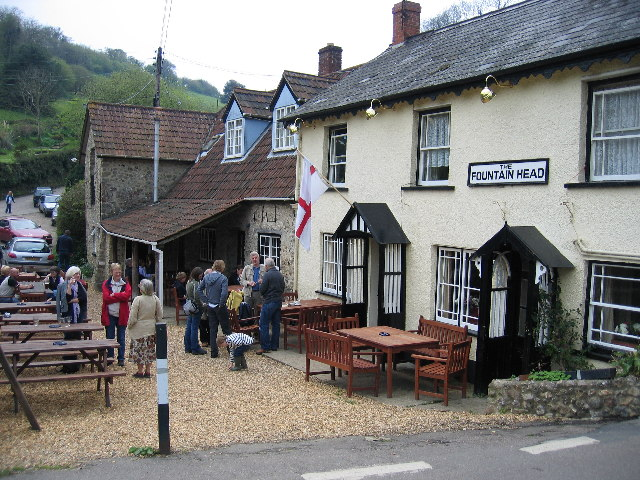

- Location within Devon
- Population: 507 (2011)
- OS grid reference: SY195885
- Civil parish: Branscombe
- District: East Devon
- Shire county: Devon
- Region: South West
- Country: England
- Sovereign state: United Kingdom
- Post town: SEATON
- Postcode district: EX12
- Dialling code: 01297
- Police: Devon and Cornwall
- Fire: Devon and Somerset
- Ambulance: South Western
- UK Parliament: Honiton and Sidmouth

Branscombe is a village in the East Devon district of the English County Devon.

The parish covers 3,440 acres (1,390 ha). Its permanent population in 2009 was estimated at 513 by the Family Health Services Authority, reducing to 507 at the 2011 Census. It is located within the East Devon Area of Outstanding Natural Beauty, overlooking Lyme Bay.

Branscombe has one of the South West's most scenic bus routes. AVMT Buses run service 899 from Seaton to Sidmouth via Beer and Branscombe.

== History ==
The name of the parish is probably Celtic in origin. It is made up of two words, "Bran" and "cwm". Bran is a well-established Celtic personal or tribal name that may also mean "black" or "crow black". Cwm is a topographical term still in use in English as well as modern Welsh to describe a steep-sided hollow or valley. Thus the name may derive from the first Celtic family or tribe to take possession of the land, probably from the Dumnonii tribe, sometime between 2700 and 2000 BC.

From the 17th to the 19th centuries, Branscombe was a source of hand-made lace, and Branscombe Point is a style that is still practised by lacemakers worldwide. Fishing was also a traditional industry, as well as a source of food. The manufacture of flints for early guns and the cooking of limestone to make fertiliser were short-lived but important local enterprises in the eighteenth and nineteenth centuries.

The current Church of Saint Winifred was built between 1133 and 1160 in the Norman era and enlarged in stages over the following 200 years, but there is some archaeological evidence suggesting there may have been a former Saxon church or building on the site.

Aethelweard (c.880-922), the youngest son of King Alfred the Great and his wife Ealhswith whom he married in 868, inherited Branscombe by his father's will of 899, a copy of which is now in the British Library.

The church contains a memorial of the Wadham family originally of Wadham, Knowstone, in north Devon and later seated at Merryfield, Ilton Somerset, who lived at Edge in the north of the parish from the end of the fourteenth century, and later used it as their dower house. When Nicholas Wadham died in 1609, part of his fortune was used to found Wadham College, Oxford.

== Today ==
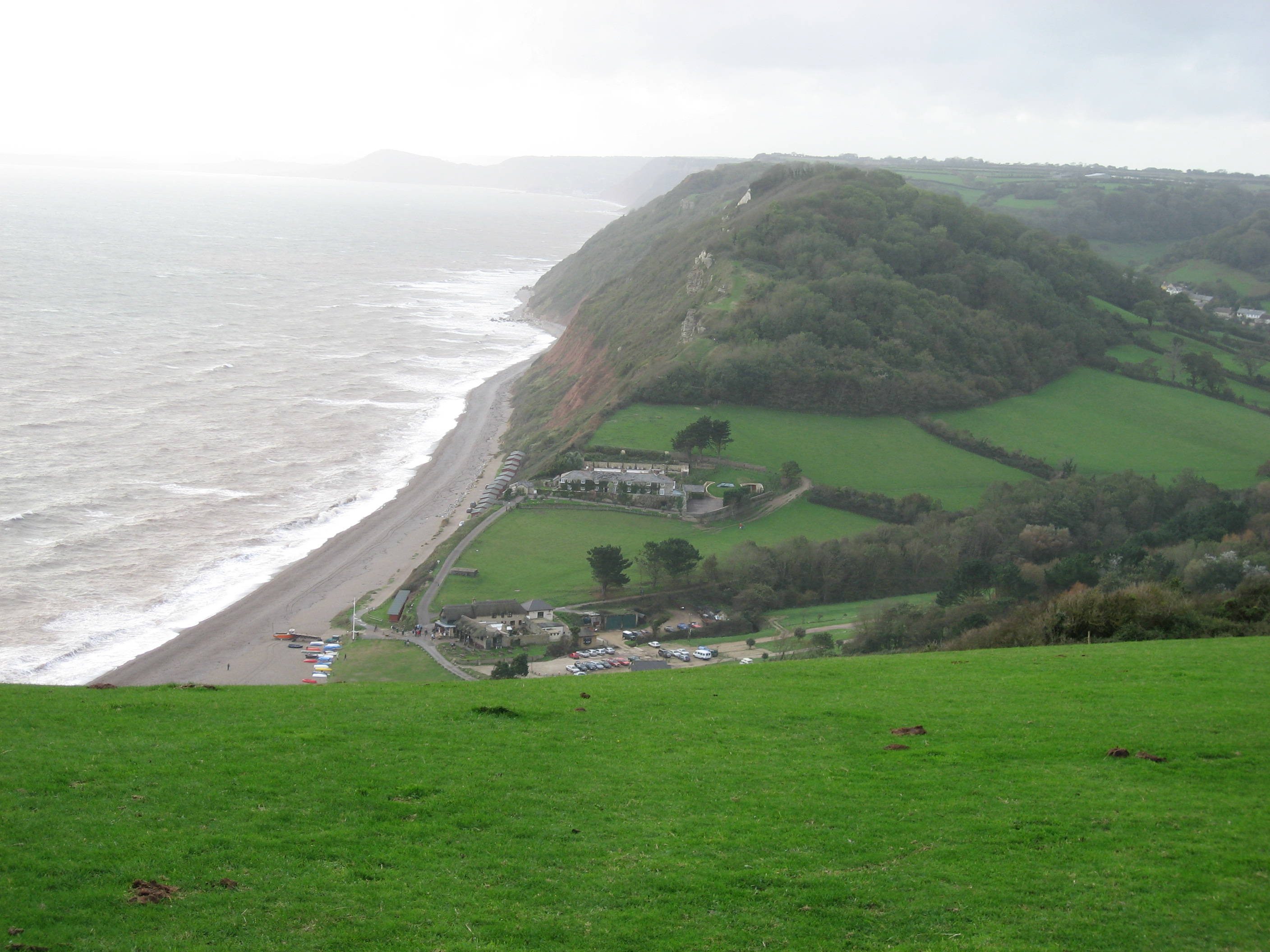
Branscombe Mouth from East Cliff

Branscombe's principal industries are farming and tourism, although a significant number of permanent residents are retired. In 2009 over half the estimated population were aged over 50. The village straggles along narrow roads down steep-sided valleys, terminating at a shingle beach, Branscombe Mouth, which forms part of the East Devon and Dorset Jurassic Coast. To either side of the beach, the coast rises steeply to cliffs, which are in the ownership of the National Trust. It is a popular point for starting walks on the South West Coast Path; it is a short walk eastwards to Beer (with two alternative routes, one at the top of the cliffs and the other ascending the cliffs via the interesting Hooken Undercliff area and a longer walk westwards towards Sidmouth.

There is a small primary school, which had 68 pupils in 2005. It is owned and operated by the Church of England with grant assistance from the Devon County Council. The original building dates from 1878.

There are two public houses in the parish, the Fountain Head and the Mason's Arms, both of which were included in CAMRA's Good Beer Guide 2008. The Fountain Head is sited at the source of a spring in the hamlet of Street. The name of the Mason's Arms is a reminder that stone quarrying in the nearby beer stone caves was once a major employer in the village; from the undercliff path east of Branscombe Mouth, an adit to the former beer stone mine can be seen. The Mason's Arms is also a hotel. A village brewery, Branscombe Vale Brewery, has won many awards for its beer.

The village contains three National Trust properties, The Old Bakery, Manor Mill & Forge, restored by the Trust, which has owned them since 1965.

July 2013 saw the inaugural Branscombe Music Festival, hosted by BBC Radio 3 presenter Petroc Trelawny. Performers included the Carducci String Quartet, Philip Higham (cello), Ailyn Pérez and Stephen Costello with Iain Burnside (piano), the Leo Green Experience jazz band and the Trelights Brass Quintet.

== MSC Napoli ==
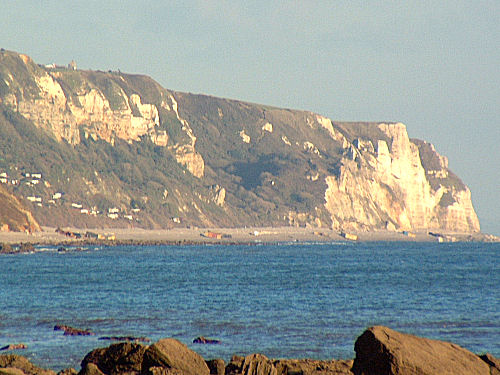
Branscombe Beach showing MSC Napoli containers

On 18 January 2007 the container ship MSC Napoli was holed whilst in the English Channel during the storm Kyrill, forcing the rescue of her 26-man crew by French Navy and Royal Navy helicopters. On Saturday 20 January 2007 she was beached at Branscombe to enable the salvage of the cargo.

The MSC Napoli was carrying 2,394 containers, of which around 150 contained "hazardous" substances including industrial and agricultural chemicals, according to the Maritime and Coastguard Agency. The ship was beached following serious structural failure, amidst fears she would not reach nearby Portland Harbour. Items of cargo were stolen in acts of wrecking.

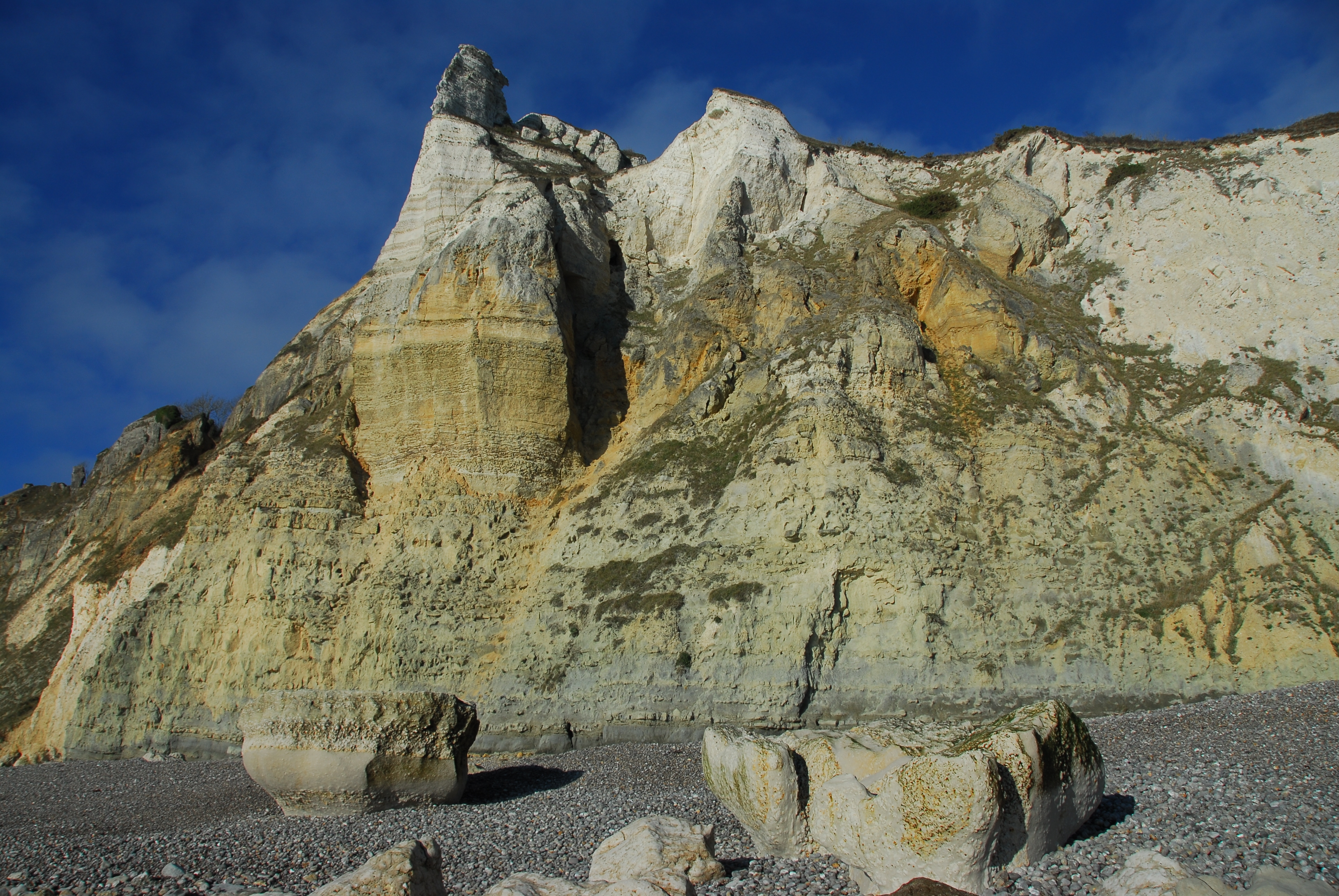
The Pinnacle on Branscombe Beach
