= Tape lace =

Lace made from pre-made lace tapes

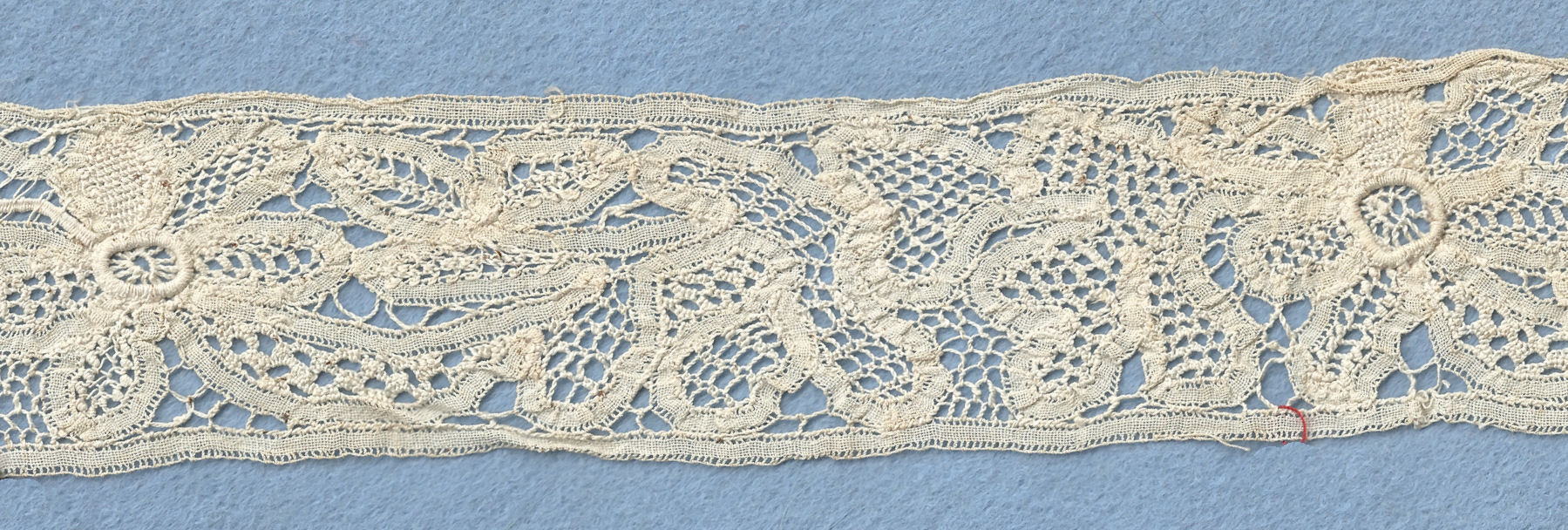
Tape lace

Tape lace is made with a straight tape which is bent into the shape required and sewn into position. Various needle lace fillings may be used to fill the gaps. The tape is usually machine made. This type of lace is also known as mixed tape lace, or mixed lace, as it uses more than one technique: one in making the tape, and a different technique for the fillings and joins.

This should be distinguished from bobbin tape lace, which is a type of bobbin lace where the tape and the rest of the lace is made at the same time using bobbins, so only one technique is used.

The 19th century tape laces varied from well-worked versions with a variety of filling stitches to those where the tapes were simply joined with a few needle-made bars.

Making tape laces was a popular craft and patterns were widely available in shops and magazines. However, tape lace was also developed on a professional basis in some places, such as Branscombe in Devon and Borris lace in Ireland.

Types of tape lace include Renaissance, Battenberg and Princess.
