= Princess lace =

Type of floral tape lace

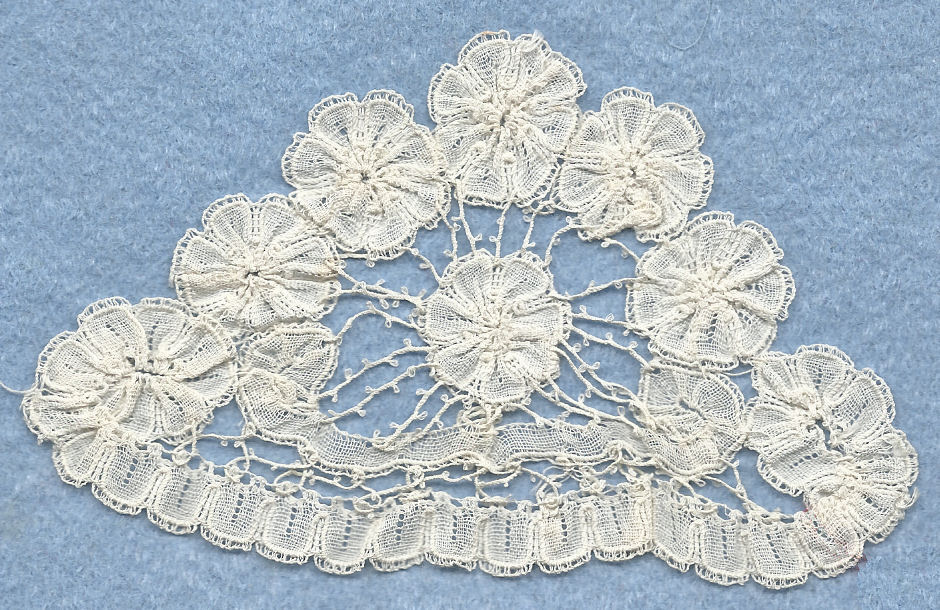
Princess lace, made with machine tape

Princess lace is a tape lace. It is made of straight machine-made lace tapes also called princess lace. The lacemaker bends and folds these into the shape of flowers and leaves, and sews them into position.

== History ==
Princess lace was introduced at the end of the 19th century in Belgium. The most famous cities for princess lace were Aalst, Ninove, Geraardsbergen, Dendermonde and Liedekerke. It is reputed to be called Princess lace because the Belgium Royal Family used it.

Princess lace was mostly a home industry. In 1993, there were still 15 lace merchants who asked lacemakers to make princess lace.
