= Chebka =

Tunisian needle lace

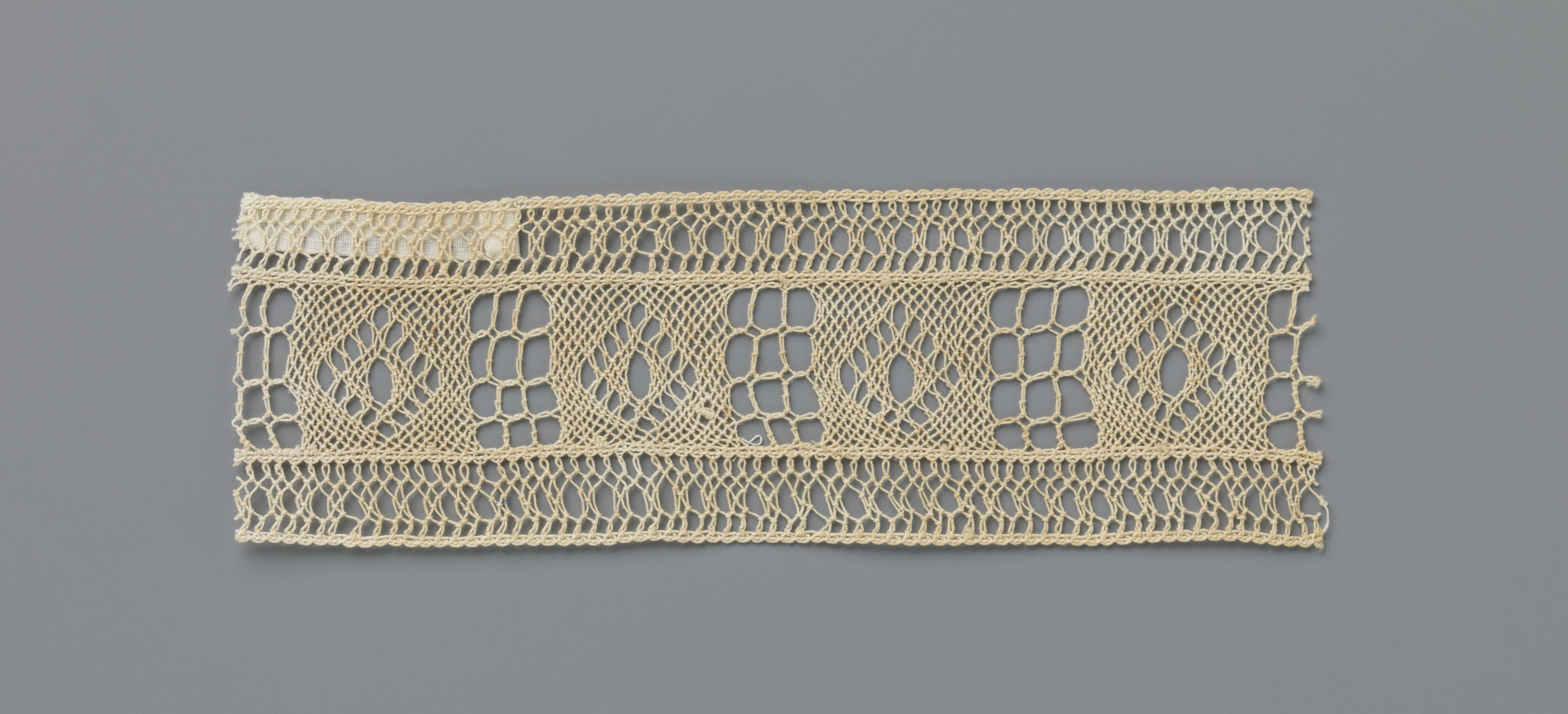
Strips of linen chebka lace from the early 1900s

Chebka is a type of needle lace originating from Tunisia. It is made to embellish household items, make collars, and as insertion for garments. The lace is sometimes made using a pillow. It can also be worked directly onto fabric or made using a paper template. The selvedges are made using machine stitches onto the paper or braids. The design is filled in using knotted stitches.

== See also ==
- Oya
- Armenian needle lace
- Greek lace
- Hollie point
