= Eyelet =

Eyelet may refer to:

- Eyelet fabric
- Grommet
