= Broderie anglaise =

Creative works made with eyelets and other open-work embroidery techniques

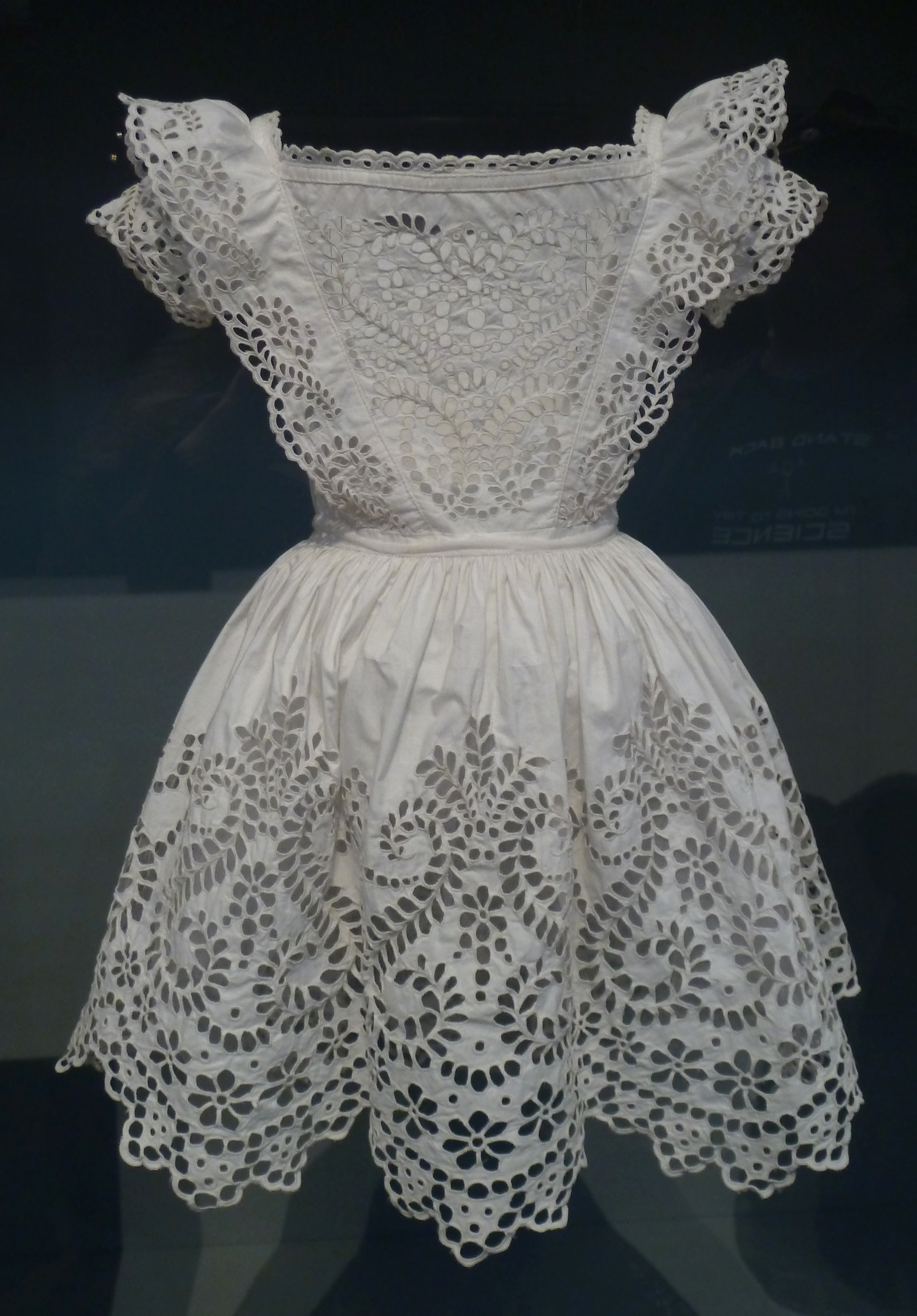
Boy's frock, white plain weave cotton with broderie anglaise, probably English, c. 1855, Los Angeles County Museum of Art

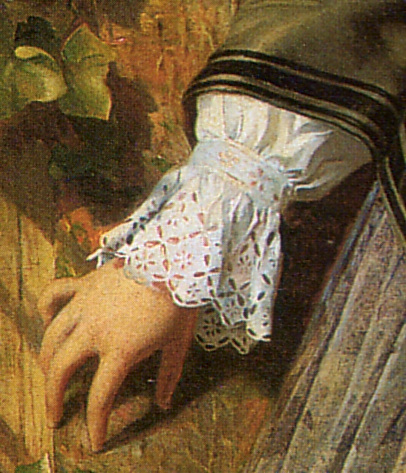
Broderie anglaise cuff, detail from Broken Vows by Philip Hermogenes Calderon

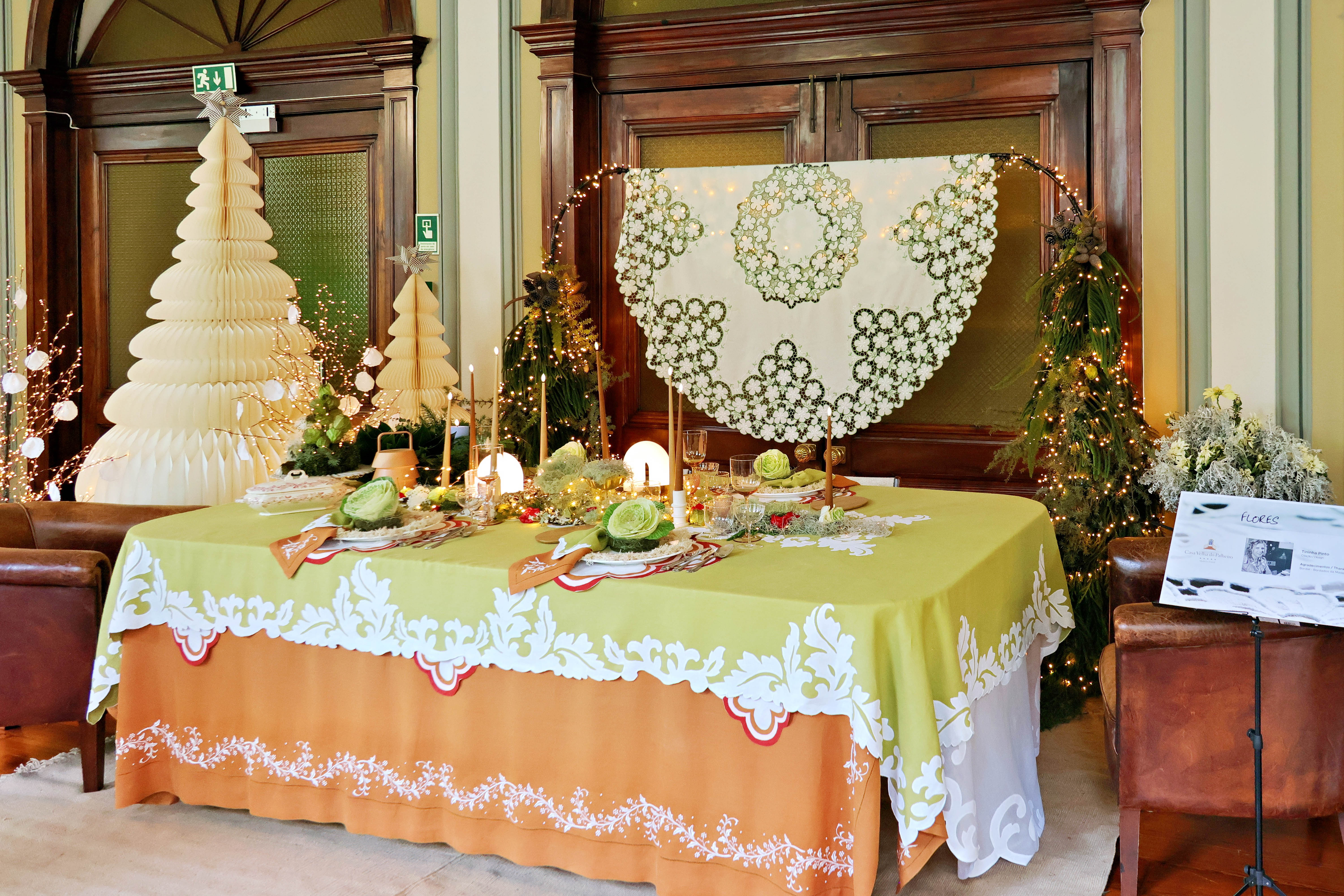
Madeira works

Broderie anglaise (French, "English embroidery", pronounced [bʁɔdʁi ɑ̃ɡlɛz]) is a whitework needlework technique incorporating features of embroidery, cutwork and needle lace that became associated with England, due to its popularity there in the 19th century.

== History and technique ==
Broderie anglaise is characterized by patterns composed of round or oval holes, called eyelets, which are cut out of the fabric, then bound with overcast or buttonhole stitches. The patterns, often depicting flowers, leaves, vines, or stems, are further delineated by simple embroidery stitches made on the surrounding material. Later broderie anglaise also featured small patterns worked in satin stitch.

The technique originated in 16th century eastern Europe—probably in what is now the Czech Republic—but remains associated with England because of its popularity there during the 19th century. In the Victorian era, broderie anglaise typically had open areas in many sizes. Transfers were used first to lay out the design on the material. In some cases, the holes were punched out with an embroidery stiletto before finishing the edge; in other cases, the fabric was embroidered first, and the hole was cut afterwards, with scissors. Beginning in the 1870s, the designs and techniques of broderie anglaise could be copied by the Swiss hand-embroidery and schiffli embroidery machines. Today, most broderie anglaise is created by machine.

Madeira work is a popular form of broderie anglaise associated with artisans on Madeira, a group of Portuguese islands off the coast of Africa.

=== Similarities with Chikankari ===
Chikankari, first recorded in the 16th century in Persia and India, involves intricate needlework with openwork and embroidery. Both techniques use specialised tools to punch holes in the fabric, allowing for the creation of intricate patterns. In Chikankari, a stitch called "Hool" exemplifies this, using a fine detached eyelet stitch where a hole is punched in the fabric and the threads are teased apart.

== Fashion and popular culture ==
Broderie anglaise was extremely popular in England between 1840 and 1880 for women's underclothing and children's wear. The 1950s saw a resurgence in popularity, when it was frequently used to trim dresses and underwear. In 1959, Brigitte Bardot wore a dress of gingham and broderie anglaise for her wedding to Jacques Charrier.

In contemporary western fashion, it has been featured on a wide variety of modern garments such as shorts and even t-shirts. It has been characterized as "lace, but scaled-up" making it more robust and suited to daytime wear, and less associated with the fine, lacy look of lingerie.
