= Greek lace =

Early form of lace

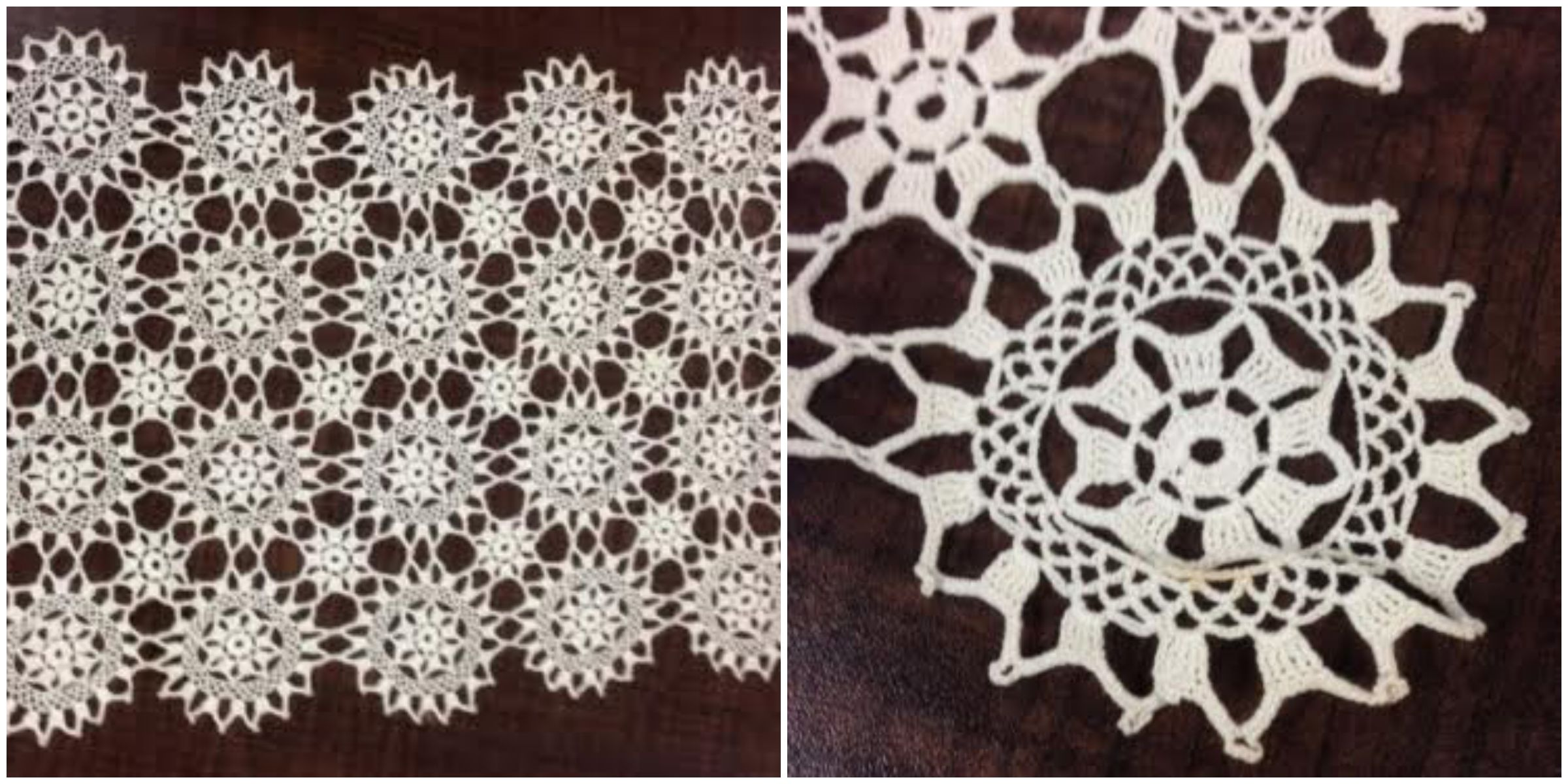
Ornate Greek Lace pattern

Greek lace is considered one of the earliest forms of all lace. Some types of Greek lace include reticella, Roman lace, cutwork, Venetian guipure, and Greek point lace

== History ==
Greek Lace was used in large quantities for the decoration of ecclesiastical vestments and cere cloths. The earliest types of Greek lace were created by straight lines buttoned over in repetition. In the beginning, Greek lace specimens were primarily formed in the simplest type of geometrical outlines. Originally, this lace was made from a tracing on parchment and then woven on a cushion in order to create the ornate pattern. As time passed and the process developed, greater variety of geometrical designs were created and shown in the lace. Patterns became more full, and the bars more ornate. The complex designs of the Greek lace were always formal and often arranged with excellent artistic effect. Geometrical outlines such as circles and triangles were slowly added to the lace to enhance its dimensions. The Ionian Islands are recognized as being the home to the creation of the Greek lace. Reticella was mentioned in the Sforza Inventory in 1493, which spread the idea and technique even further. Other countries like Germany, France, Spain, Flanders, and England all made only a very limited extent of the Greek Lace, but it eventually was mocked and imitated, creating more types of lace. However, Greek lace became popular outside of the main manufacturing countries.

== Etymology ==
Between the fifteenth to the eighteenth centuries, the term Greek lace may have originated from the time when the Ionian Islands were in the possession of the Venetian Republic. A true lace is created when a thread is looped, braided, or twisted to other threads independently from a fabric in one of 3 ways: (1) with a needle, when the work is distinctively known as "needlepoint lace" (2) with bobbins, pins on a pillow or cushion, when the work is known as 'pillow lace" (3) by machinery. Originally, lace was made with linen, silk, gold, or silver threads, but now lace is often made with cotton thread. There is no evidence to prove that Greek Lace was ever produced for commercial purposes in Greece. It is speculated that the term may have originated between the 15th and 18th century, when the Ionian Islands were under the rule of the Venetian Republic.

== Modern uses ==
In modern day, Greek lace, or Reticella, is generally considered a furniture lace. Greek Lace is also used as decoration rather than clothing. Authentic Greek lace is now predominantly made in Italy. Modern Greek lace is made with flax thread only, rather than the silk that was originally used.

Mass production of lace is also common. While it is not authentic, the patterns often have resemblance to the geometric structures of Greek lace. Modern popular uses for lace are primarily for decoration and wedding attire. Due to its popularity, it became very widespread around the world and was modified to create other types of lace, modernly known as imitations.

== Distinguishing Greek lace ==
Since Greek lace is one of the earliest form of needle lace, there are many different variations that are difficult to distinguish. One of the biggest differentiations between different types of old Greek lace is whether it is "Italian or Flemish." However, specimens have shown that there are no standard differences between the two. Very early Greek lace can be identified by lace trimmings. Authentic Greek lace is identified by the procedure of buttoning over the thread in specific patterns and can ideally be distinguished from others. When Greek lace is made by machine, it is made entirely differently. It is either woven, where two threads are used, or embroidered, when a pattern is embroidered onto something that is later removed.
