= OIDFA =

Non-profit French organization for lacemakers and lace enthusiasts

The International Bobbin and Needle Lace Organization
- L’Organisation Internationale de la Dentelle au Fuseau et à l’Aiguille
- Formation: 1982
- Headquarters: France
- Region served: world
- Members: Lace artists, scholars, and educators
- Official language: French and English
- Website: www.oidfa.com

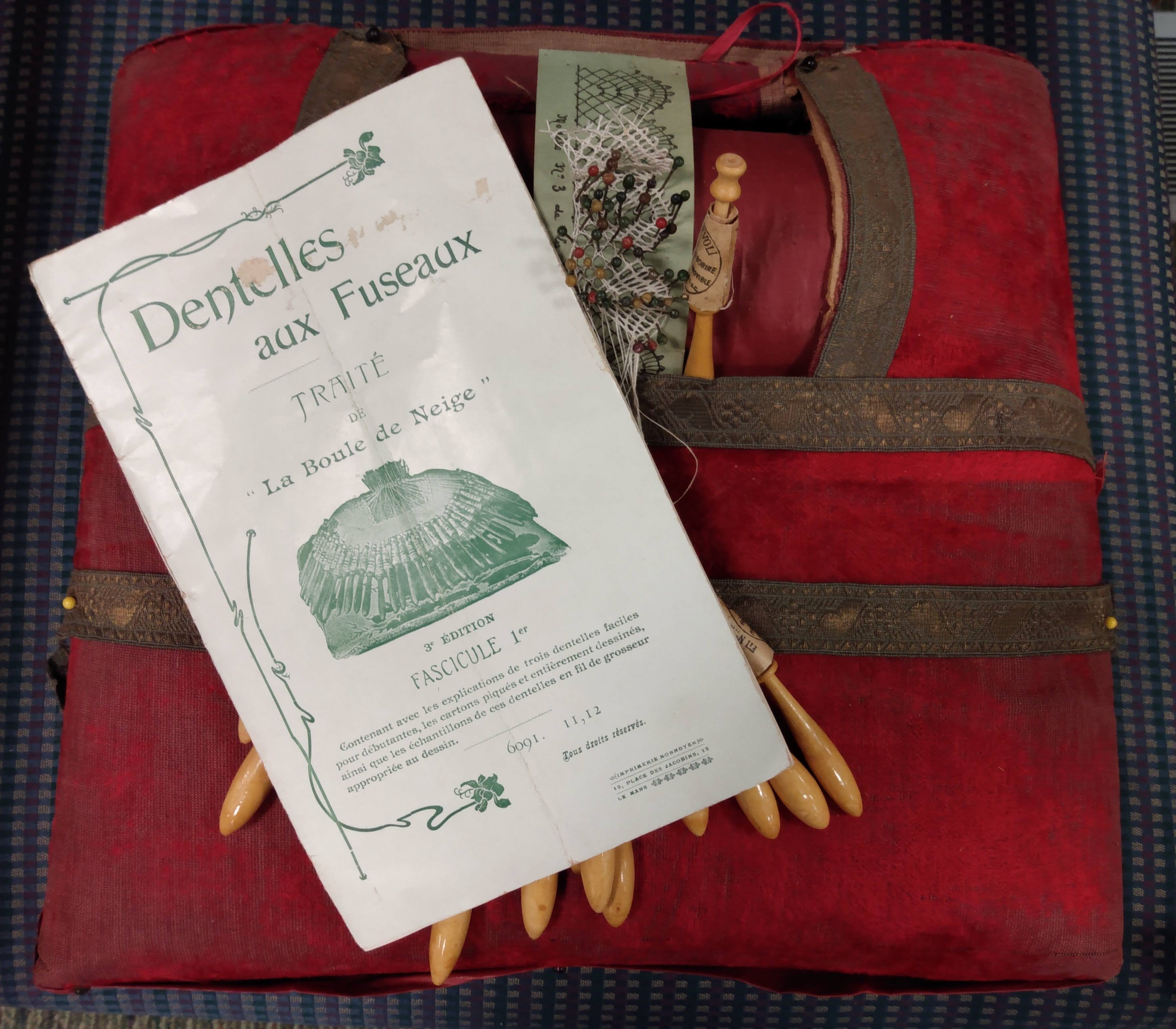
French bobbin lace pillow with booklet about the tools

OIDFA (Organisation Internationale de la Dentelle au Fuseau et à l’Aiguille) is a non-profit organization based in France that supports the international community of lace enthusiasts and promotes the study and practice of lacemaking.

== History and Activities ==
OIDFA was founded in 1982 in France. Its name stands for The International Bobbin and Needle Lace Organization. It promotes lace making through three main activities: 1) organizing conferences and workshops bringing lacemakers together for educational opportunities; 2) quarterly publications providing information on lace history, art, and community meeting opportunities; and 3) connecting its members to museums for exhibitions of expertise provision.

Publications from OIDFA include conference proceedings as well as lace techniques, identification, and history including regional costume traditions that include lace.

OIDFA organized a Congress every two years since 1982 in various European locations around Europe until 2020, when the COVID-19 pandemic prevented travel. It resumed organizing this event in 2023. The Congress celebrates the local lace traditions where it is held: for instance, the 2023 Congress in Nova Gorcia focused on lace traditions in Slovenia. It also encourages learning new lace traditions, by encouraging lacemakers around the world to realize a pattern developed for the event and sending it for display.
