= Bella Phelps =

British philanthropist (1820–1893)

Elizabeth "Bella" Phelps (1820 – 1893) was a British philanthropist, educator, and promoter of Madeira embroidery, best known for developing and commercializing the craft on the Portuguese island of Madeira.

Through her efforts, she transformed it into a thriving cottage industry that empowered local women economically. Her promotion of the embroidery led to its international recognition, particularly through its display at the Great Exhibition of 1851 in London, where it gained widespread acclaim and established itself as a luxury export item.

== Early life ==
Bella Phelps was born in Funchal, Madeira, the daughter of Joseph Phelps, a wine shipper and the co-owner of Phelps, Page & Co, and his wife, Elizabeth. She was one of 11 children. The Phelps family had been in Funchal since 1784.

== Influence on the Great Exhibition ==
Phelps's promotional work culminated in the display of Madeira embroidery at the Great Exhibition in 1851, held at the Crystal Palace in London. Although Phelps did not attend or exhibit personally, the samples she had facilitated through her networks were showcased in the Portuguese section (often shared with Iberian or colonial displays). The embroidery, noted for its exceptional delicacy, purity, quality, and artistry, received tremendous acclaim from visitors, including British aristocracy and commercial interests familiar with Madeira through the wine trade and tourism. This exposure at the Great Exhibition marked a turning point, elevating Madeira embroidery from a local craft to an internationally recognized luxury good. It became a staple in Victorian ladies’ trousseaux and boosted exports, particularly to Britain and Europe. The success directly stemmed from Phelps’s earlier initiatives, including a local exhibition in Funchal in 1850 at the Palácio de São Lourenço, which generated interest leading to the London invitation.

== Personal life ==
Phelps suffered from a severe leg injury while horse riding. She moved to Clapham Common in 1860 and died in 1893.

== Sources ==
https://trc-leiden.nl/trc-needles/people-and-functions/businessmen/phelps-bella-1820-1893

https://www.bhsportugal.org/uploads/fotos_artigos/files/ThePhelpsfamilysaga.pdf
