= Hollie point =

Needle lacing technique originating in England

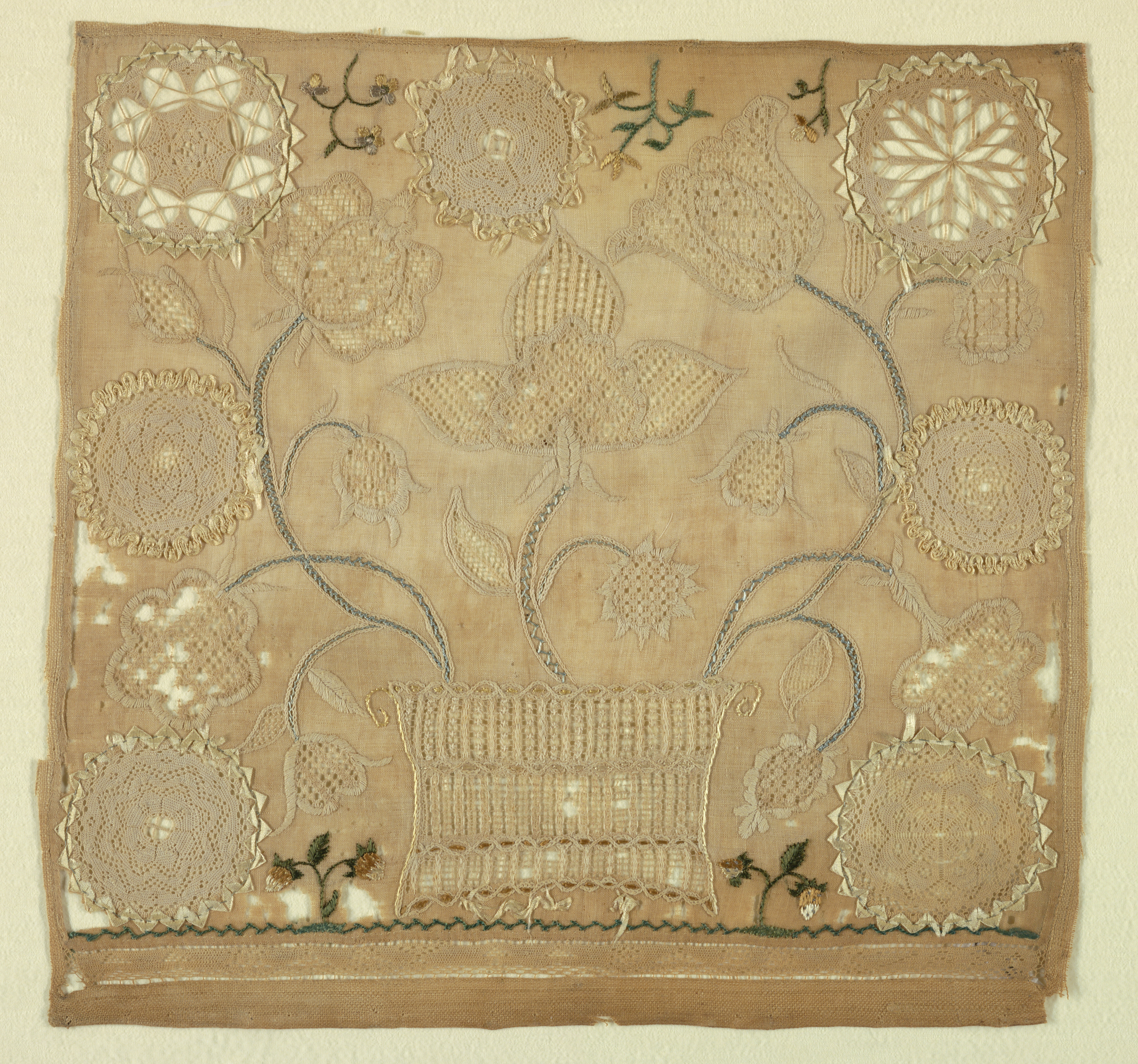
- Sampler contains Hollie point lace fillings
- Type: Lace
- Production method: Needle lace
- Production process: Craft production
- Place of origin: England
- Introduced: c16th century

Hollie point is an English needle lace noted for its use in baby clothes, particularly in the 18th century. It is also known as Holy point, because it was originally used in liturgical laces. The Puritans were the first to make common usage of Hollie point beginning in the reign of James I.

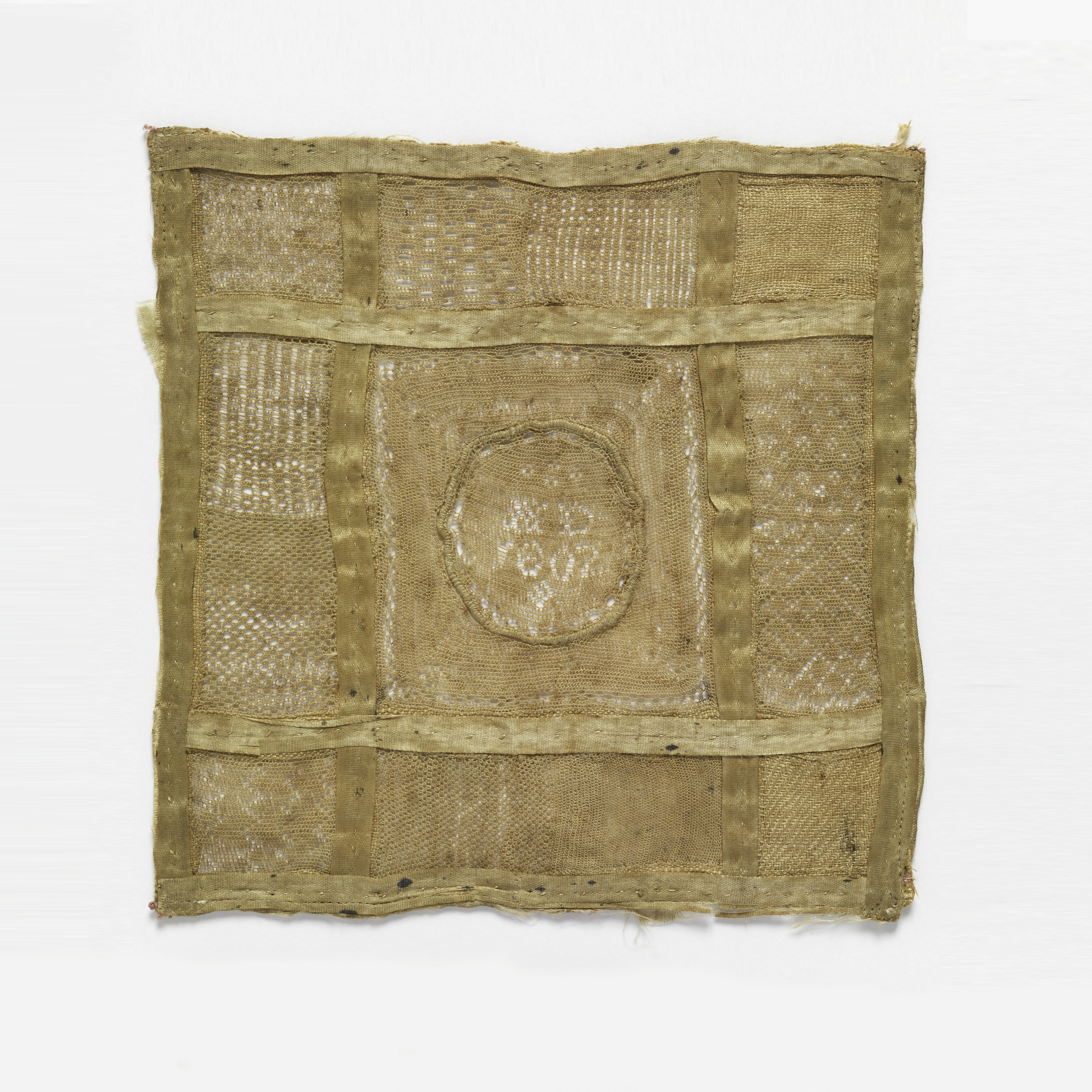
Sampler (England), 1802 (CH 18564109)

Hollie point is a flat needlepoint lace whose name derives either from lace made for religious purposes (holy work) or from the holes that create the pattern. It is made up of rows of twisted buttonhole stitches worked over horizontal threads. At the end of each row, the stitching returns to the starting point, creating the next horizontal thread. Simple pinprick designs are created by leaving gaps, or holes, in the otherwise plain cloth work formed by the buttonhole stitches.

Hollie point has always been more or a domestic, rather than a professional, art. Hollie point was used primarily on baby clothes in the 18th and early 19th century, especially, christening sets. The lace was stitched in the crown of baby bonnets, or caps, and sometimes on a band that extended from the centre front of the cap to the nape of the neck. The shoulder seams of small shirts were decorated with initials, dates, and mottoes. Lace designs included religious motifs such as lilies of the annunciation, Tree of life, Star of Bethlehem, dove of peace, and Crown of Glory.

Earlier mentions of similarly named laces, such as collars of "hollie work" that were listed in an inventory of Mary Queen of Scots, are thought to refer to other types of needlework that were done as "holy work".

The Royal School of Needlework provides guidelines and structural details to reproduce Hollie Point stitches.

== Bibliography ==
- Dye, Gilian (2021). Lace Identification: A Practical Guide. Jean Leader. La Vergne: The Crowood Press. ISBN 978-1-78500-866-5.
