= Armenian needlelace =

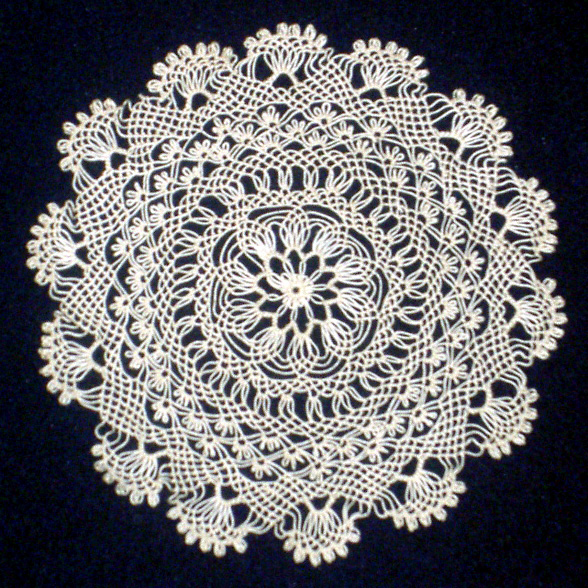
Armenian Needlelace circa 2004

Armenian needlelace (Armenian: Ժանյակ, romanized: janyak) is a form of needle lace made using only a needle, thread and pair of scissors. Women traditionally make Armenian needlelace, and the lace is used to embellish clothing and household items. It is also known in English as bebilla, Nazareth lace, and Armenian knotted lace.

== History ==
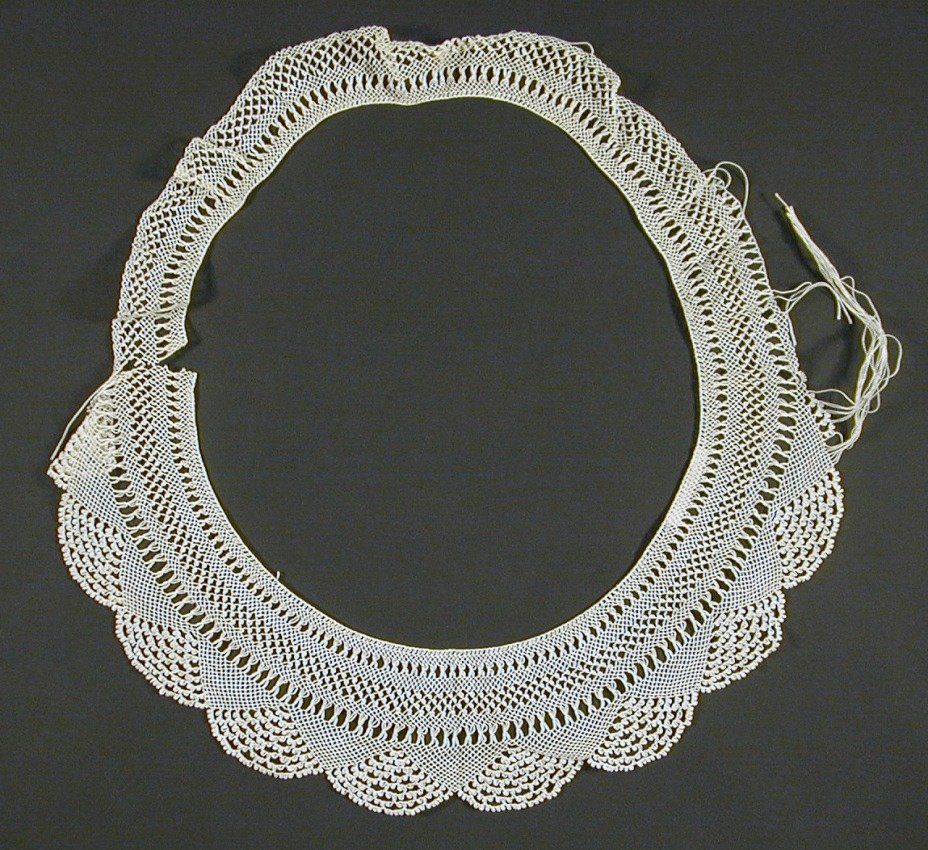
19th century cotton woven lace, Los Angeles County Museum of Art

Like lacis, or filet lace, Armenian needlelace seems to be an obvious descendant of net making. Where lacis adds decorative stitches to a net ground, Armenian needlelace involves making the net itself decorative. Representations of the lace have been described on ancient statuary, and in centuries-old stonework.

There is some archeological evidence suggesting the use of lace in prehistoric Armenia and the prevalence of pre-Christian symbology in traditional designs would certainly suggest a pre-Christian root for this art form.

Armenian lacemaking is thought to date back to before the 15th or 16th centuries. Although no textiles are preserved from that time, lacemaking seems to be referenced in some stone sculptures, especially khachkars, which look like delicate swatches of lace. Arab historians of the 10th century, listing the occupations of the Armenian people, mentioned handicrafts, headscarves, blankets, which were apparently related to lace.

It is believed that gold thread, silver thread, silk thread and pearl braided laces were known in a number of Asian countries earlier than in Europe (13th century).

In contrast to Europe where lace was the preserve of the nobility, in Armenia it decorated everything from traditional headscarves to lingerie and lacemaking was part of many or most women's lives.

== Geographic spread ==
Lacemaking was widespread in almost all provinces of Armenia. In the 19th century, Van-Vaspurakan, Upper Armenia (Karin, Kars, Alexandropol, Akhaltskhan, Akhalkalak), Cilicia (Aintap, Marash, Urfa), Lesser Hayk (Sebastian, Kesaria, Arabkir, etc.), K. Polis, Tiflis.

After the First World War and the Armenian genocide, lace business spread to a number of Arabian countries, Greece, France, and the United States. The geographical spread of Armenian lace also included a number of Armenian-populated places in Asia, Africa as well as Crimea.

== Applications ==
Armenian lace-making is quite similar to other branches of decorative-applied arts, and its designs share many similarities with khachkar, including the symmetry of their designs, richness and diversity of ornaments, and stylistic unity.

Tablecloths, curtains, blankets, ribbons of various bochchas, handkerchiefs, headscarves, as well as collars and various household items (comb bowls, button, handkerchief pockets, etc.) were made using lace weaving. The "rose" on the forehead, which was a part of head decorations of the Upper Armenia women's costume, is worthy of attention. It was woven with a needle, multi-colored silk threads, combined patterns of small flowers and leaves. The white, silk lace suspenders with lily patterns of the Cilicia-Armenian women's costume are of interest. In Karin (Erzurum), Van, Baghesh, women wove the laces of their foreheads, the edges of yapush, and yazmans. In the decoration of the head of the Armenian women's costume of Karin, not only silk threads were used, but also mother-of-pearl laces, which were sometimes woven with gold threads. Ribbon-shaped mesh pearl braided laces were hung on the temples and used as necklaces. Lace tablecloths and curtains were popular in Shatakh.

== Technique ==
The lace is made by tying knots, usually tied onto the previous round of the piece creating small loops of thread onto which the next round of knots can be tied. Patterns are created by varying the length of the loops, missing loops from the previous round, adding extra loops and similar.

When used as an edging the lace can be made directly onto the hem of the fabric being edged. When a doily or freeform object (such as the birds and flowers decorating traditional headscarves) is being started a series of loops is tied onto a slip knot which is pulled tight to complete the first round.

Armenian embroidery is rich in materials used as a base - leather, fabric, etc., as well as thread types and additional decorations. All kinds of wool, cotton, silk textures and home-made threads are used in traditional Armenian embroidery. The main tools of embroidery are a needle, thimble, scissors and a frame, which was of two types - square and circular. The square circles were called karkah (it’s a frame for embroidery). If embroidery stands were large, were adapted to be placed on the ground, and if small, to be fixed on the table. Golden thread embroidery is a constituent part of Armenian artistic needlework, which was widely spread throughout Armenia since ancient times. Armenian masters knew many ways of performing gold thread and silver thread embroidery, whose component parts were gold and silver.

== Gallery ==
Patterns of 20th century Armenian lacework, Regional History Museum of Sofia.

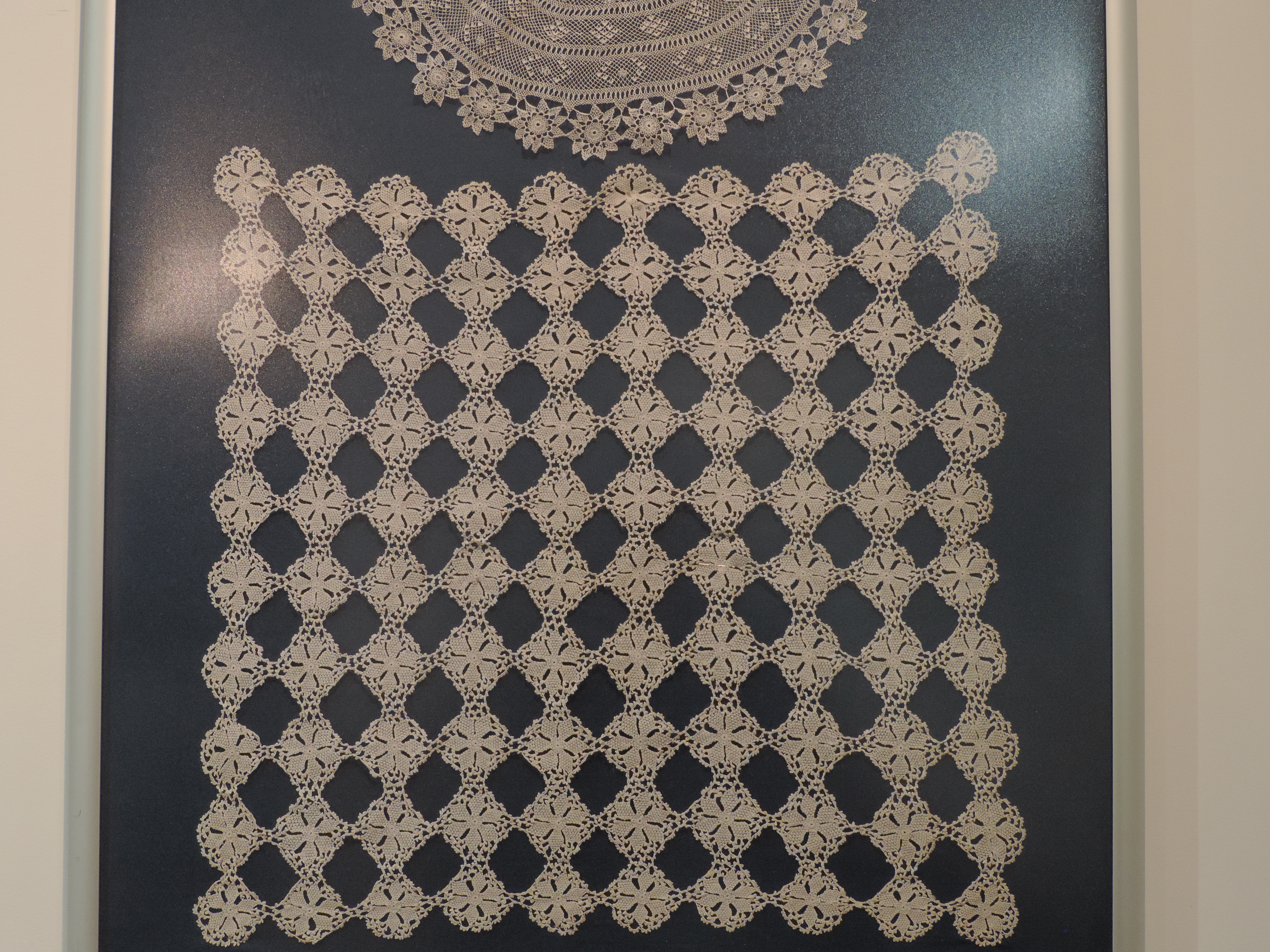

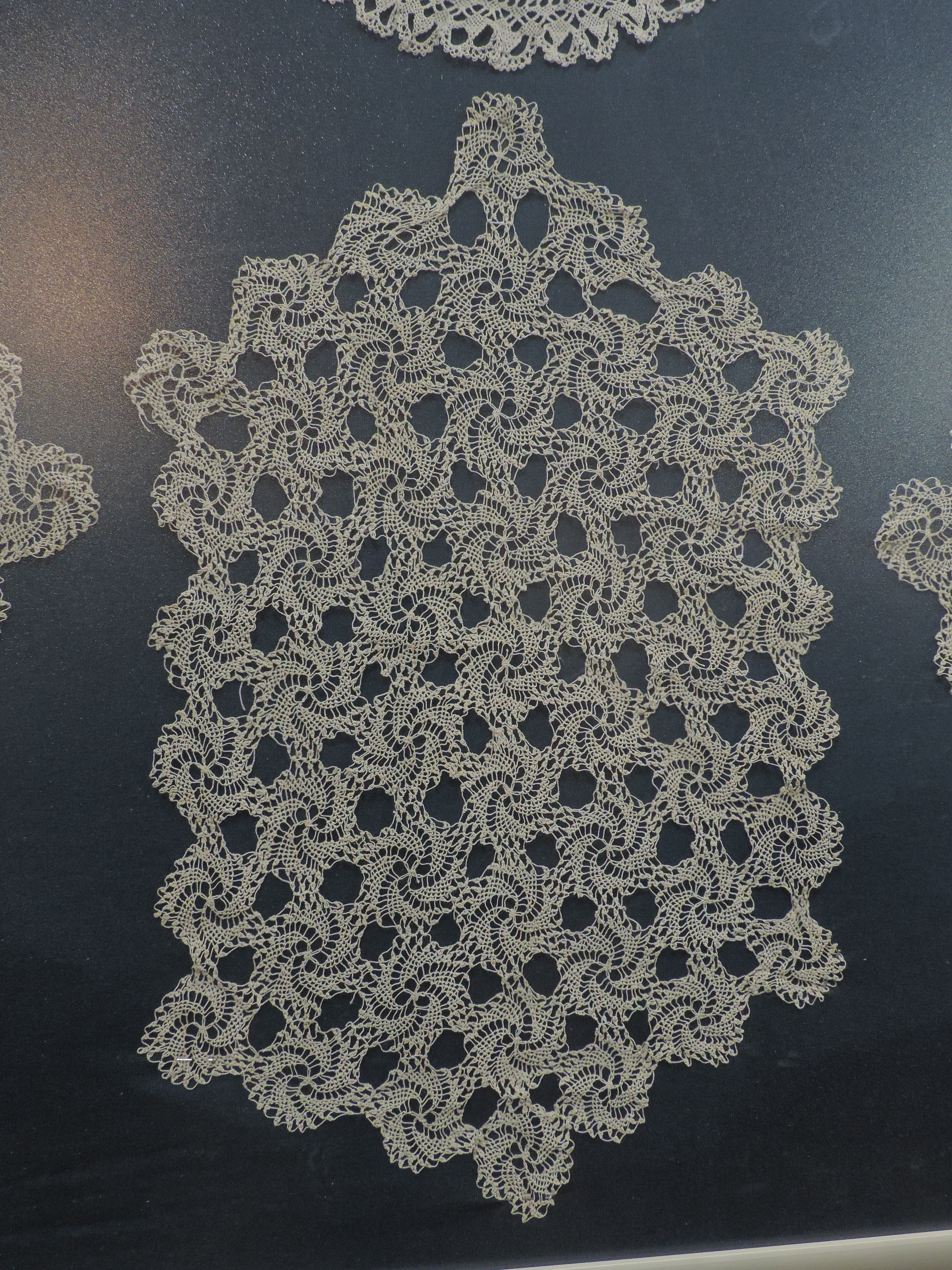

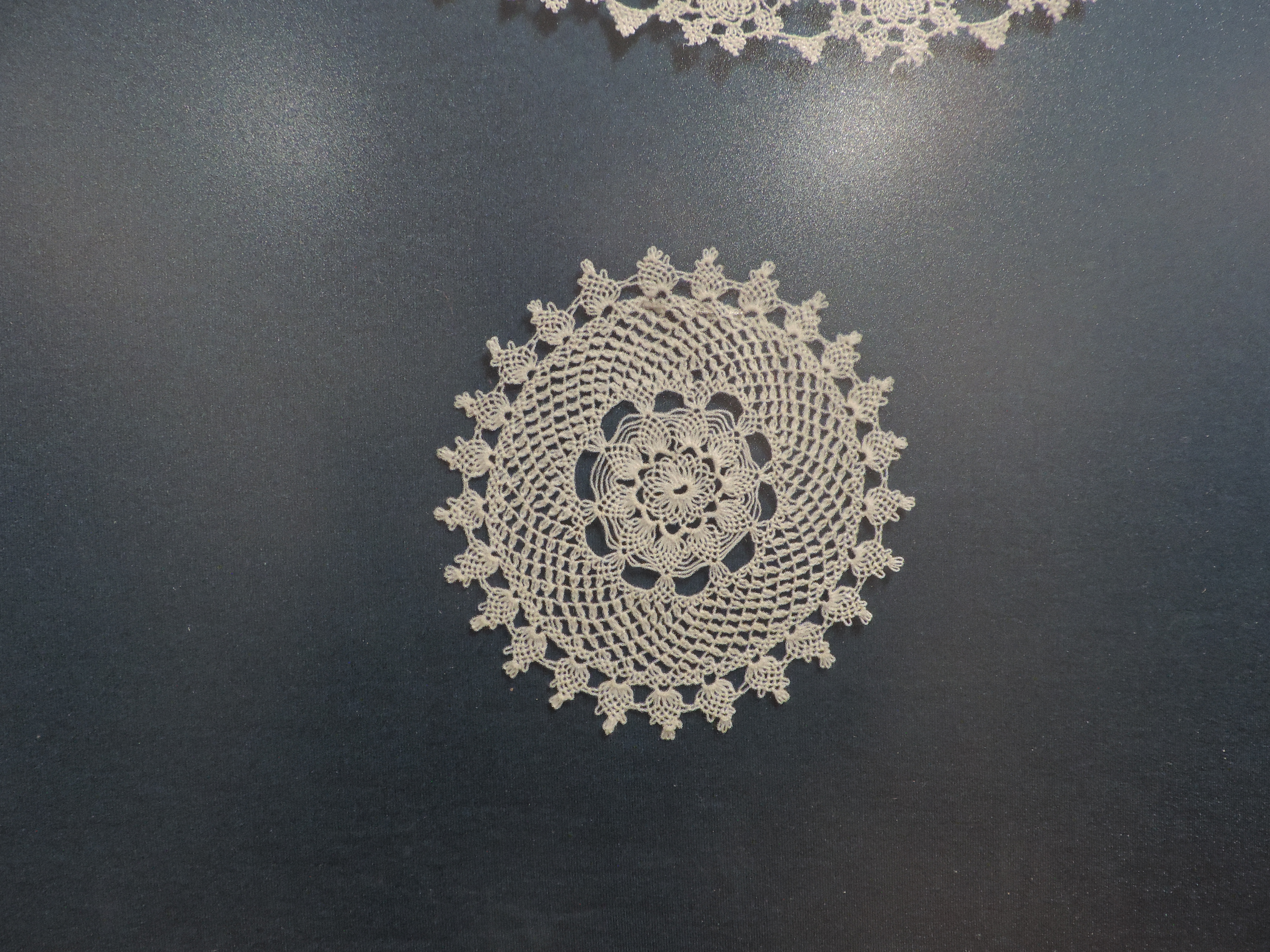

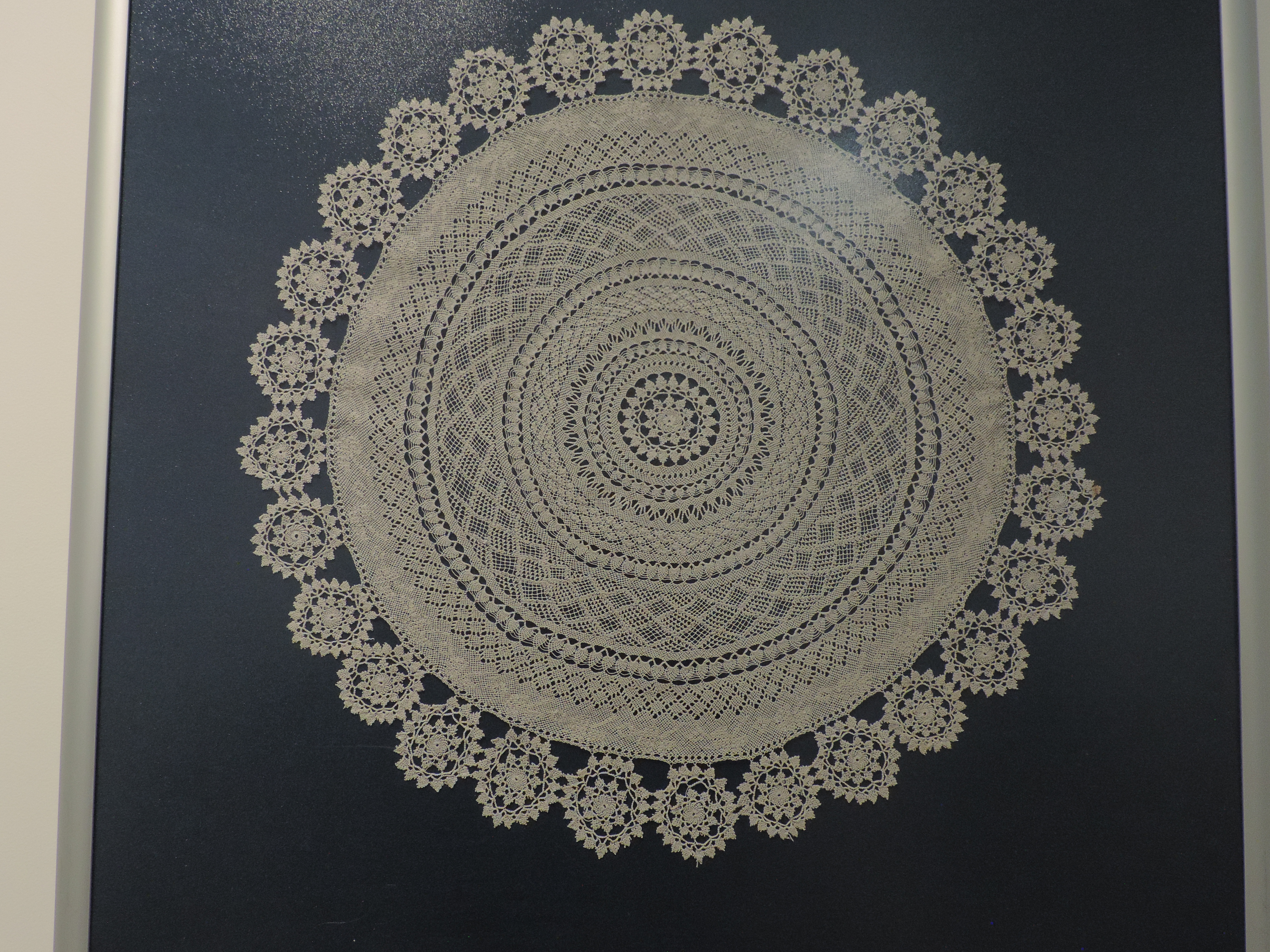

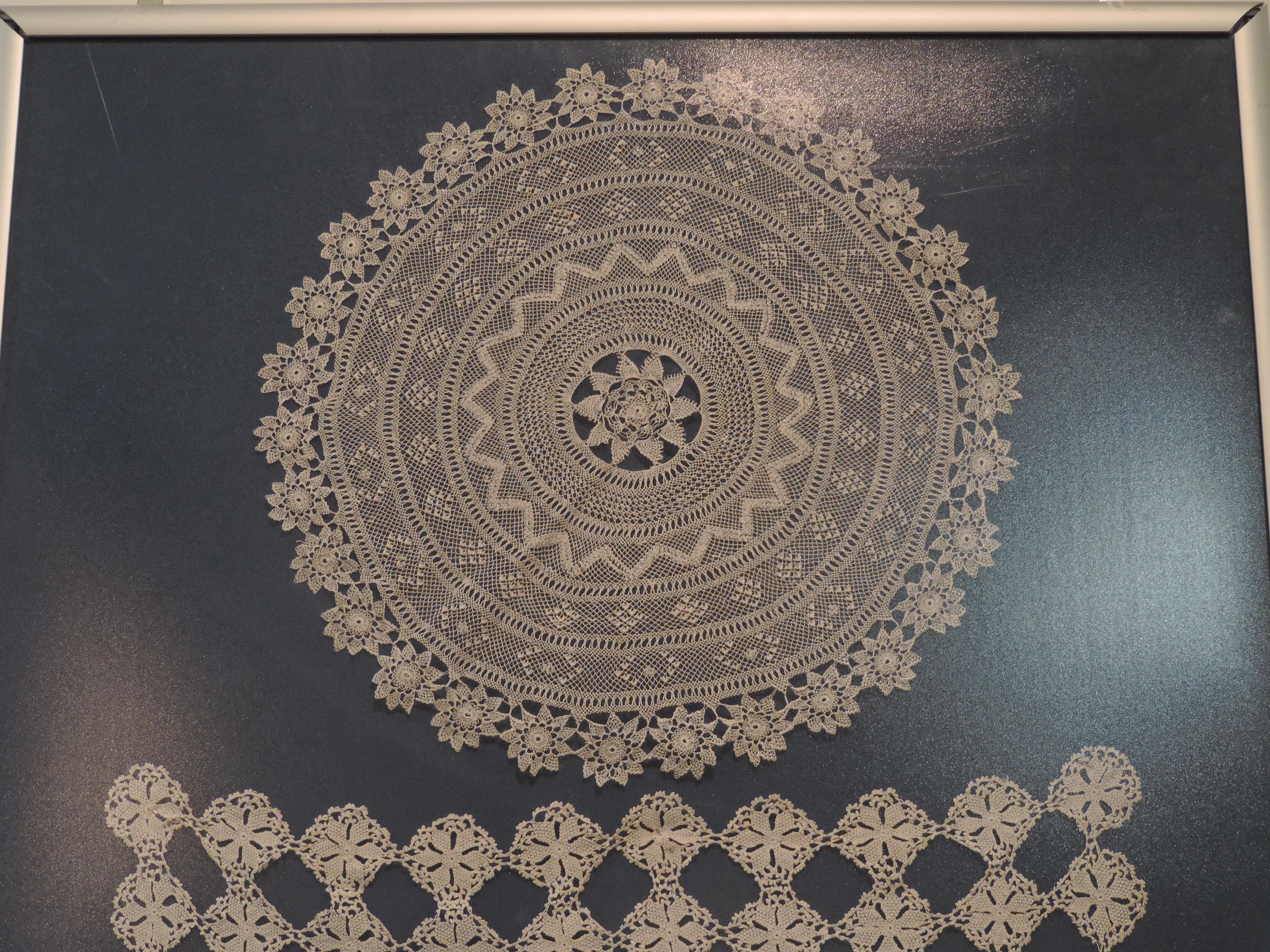

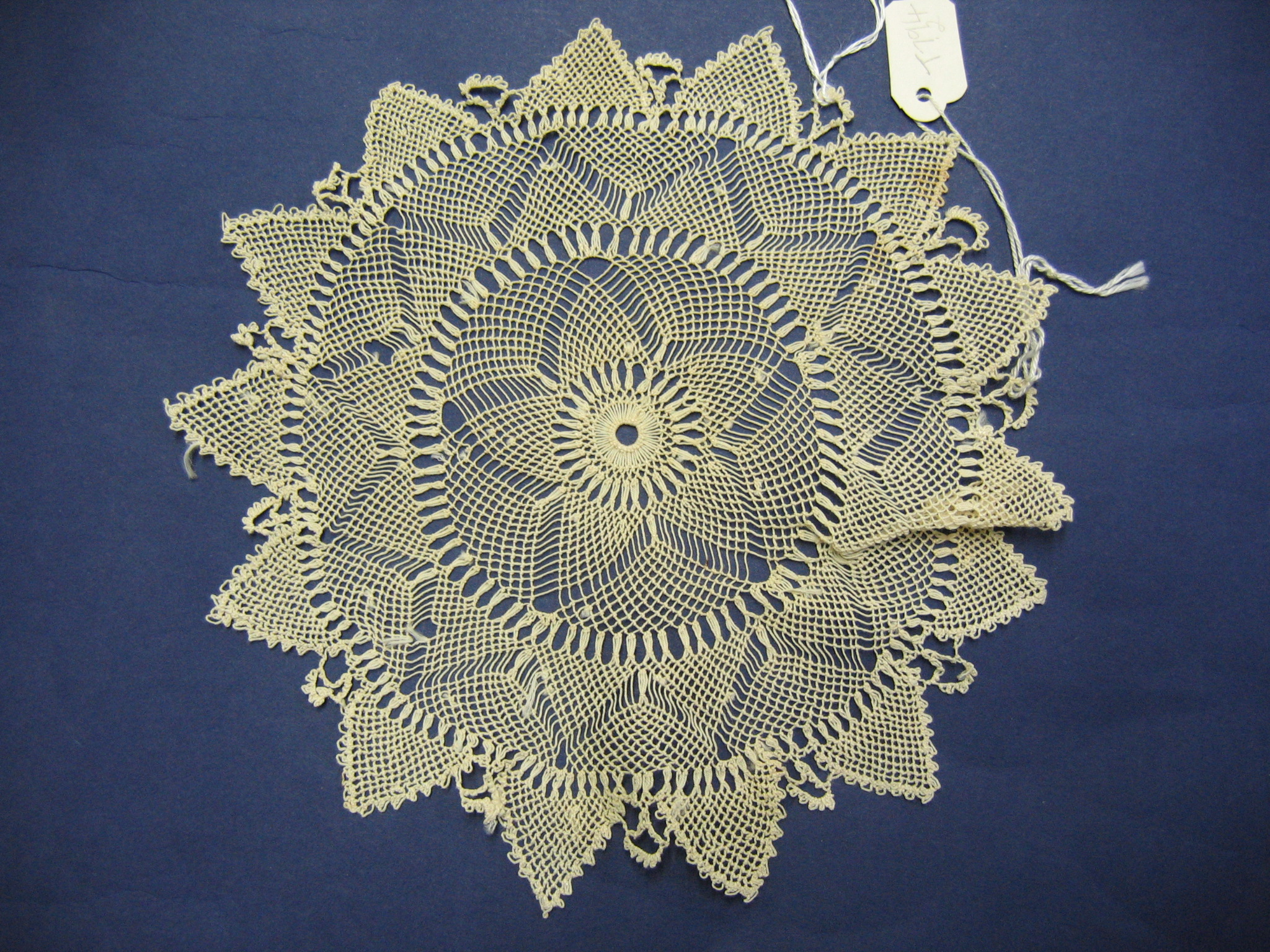
Armenian cotton lace, Auckland War Memorial Museum, New Zealand

== See also ==
- List of fabric names
