= Punto in Aria =

Early form of needle lace

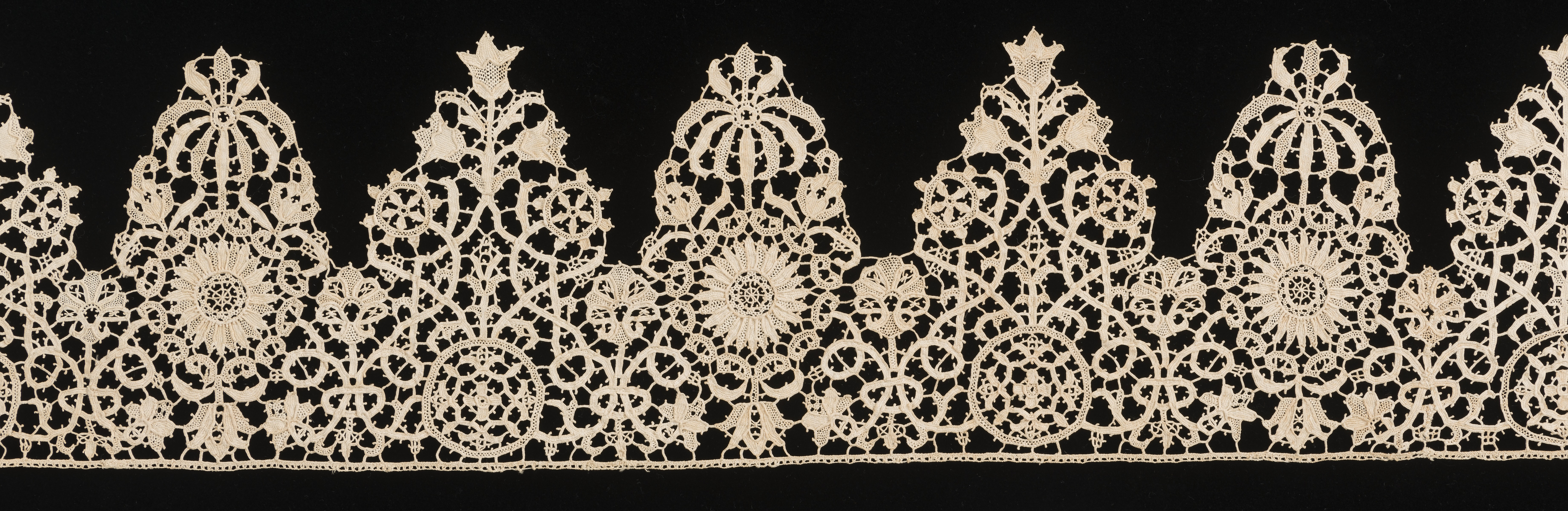
- Punto in aria band, Italy, 1601-50
- Type: Lace
- Production method: Needle lace
- Production process: Craft production
- Place of origin: Italy

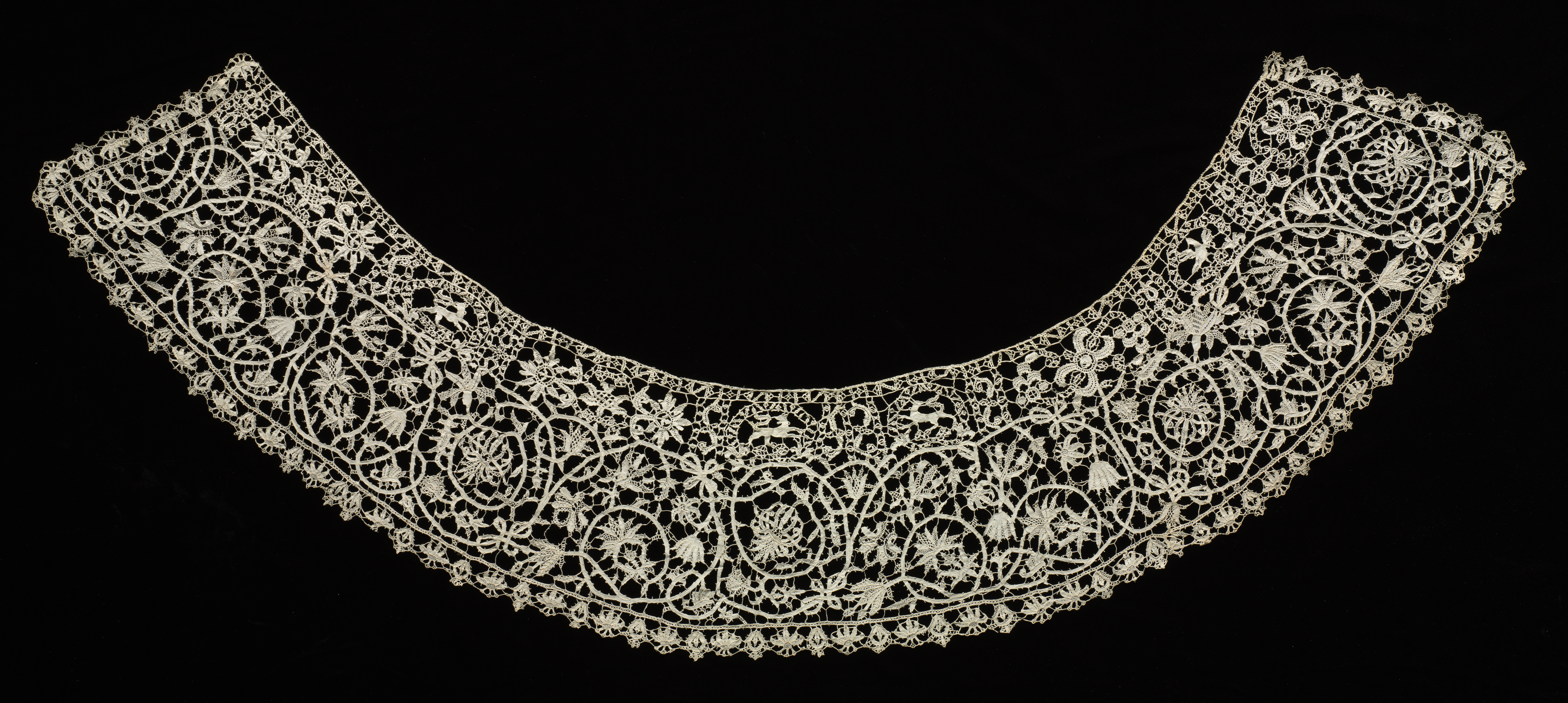
Italy, Venice, 16th-17th century - Needlepoint (Punto in aria) Lace Collar - Cleveland Museum of Art

Punto in aria (literally “stitch in air”) is an early form of needle lace devised in Italy. It is considered the first true lace because it was the first meant to be stitched alone, and not first onto a woven fabric.

It is a closely related needle lace to reticella, and their designs have many similarities when compared side by side. However, the punto in aria was an important improvement on the reticella method, and was a breakthrough in needle lace design.

== History ==
The reticella was the design that was the catalyst of the transition between fabrics made into lace by subtracting threads after needling, and lace made from scratch without fabric support. The reticella design required one to draw out threads after stitching onto fabric. As that design evolved, an increasing number of threads required withdrawing. Eventually, so many threads were drawn-out that the foundation became very flimsy and lace makers devised a new framework that did not require original foundation fabric. This came to be known as punto in aria.

== Design ==
Punto in aria retains many of the characteristics of reticella but also is able to go beyond the geometric framework. The lace makers devised a linen and parchment base for their work. This base consisted of two or three layers of fabric with the parchment pattern on top. The layers were then basted together. The pattern was then laid over with a gimp which was basted down through the pattern and layers of support fabric. When the lace was finished, the basting stitches were cut between the layers thus leaving only the lace.
