= Reticella =

Type of needle lace from Italy

Italy, Venice, 17th century - Needlepoint (Reticella) and Bobbin Lace Pillow Case - Cleveland Museum of Art

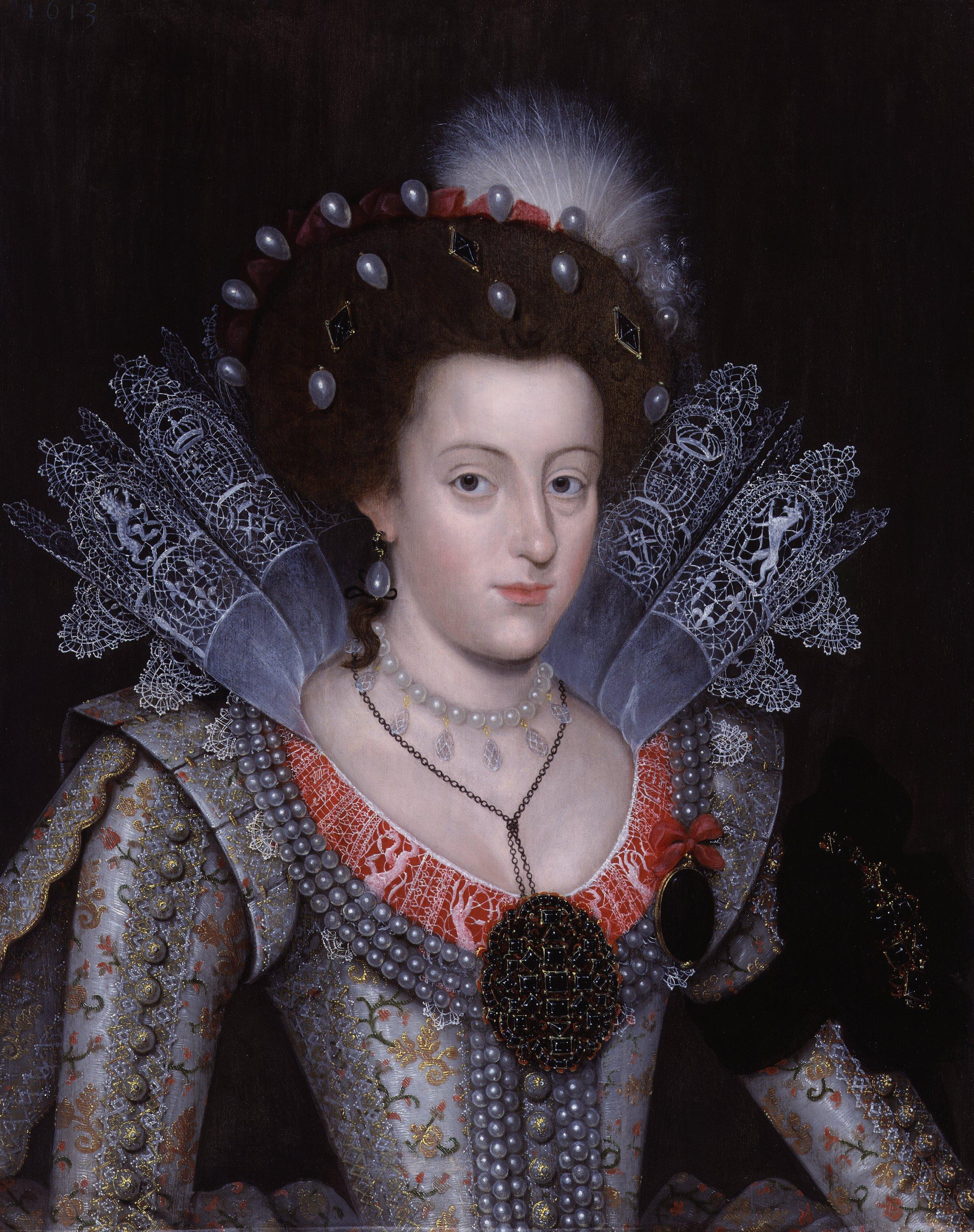
Princess Elizabeth Stuart, later Queen of Bohemia, wearing a reticella collar worked with the English royal coat of arms, unknown artist, 1613, National Portrait Gallery, London.

Reticella or reticello (in French point coupé or point couppe) is a needle lace dating from the 15th century that remained popular into the first quarter of the 17th century.

Reticella was originally a form of cutwork in which threads were pulled from linen fabric to make a grid on which the pattern was stitched, primarily using buttonhole stitch. Later reticella used a grid made by needle and thread rather than a fabric ground, developing into Punto in Aria. Both methods resulted in a characteristic geometric design of squares and circles with various arched or scalloped borders.

Books reticella patterns designed by Federico de Vinciolo (France, 1587) and Cesare Vecellio (Italy, probably from the 1590s but printed 1617) were popular and were frequently reprinted.

== Gallery ==
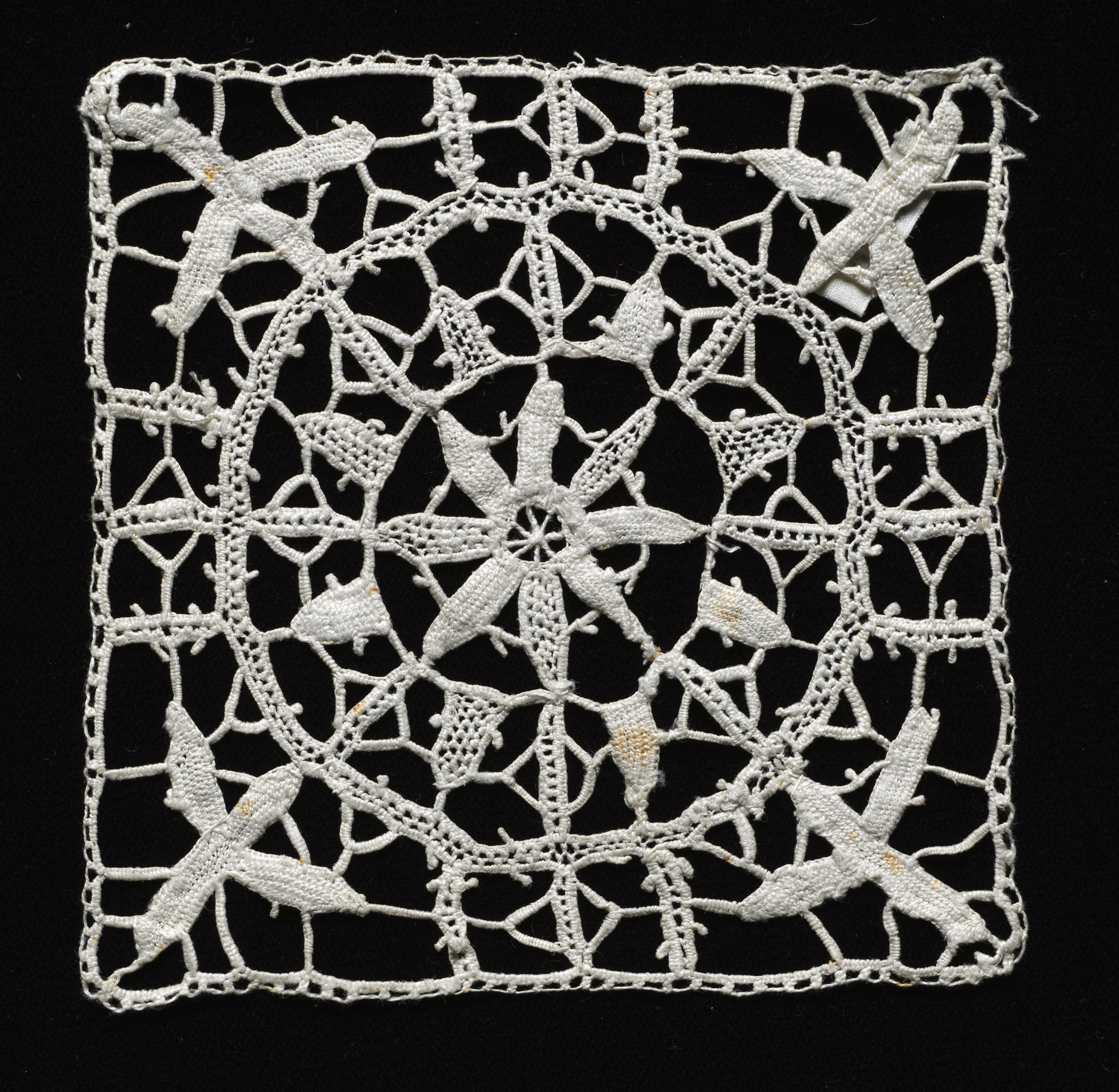
Italy, 16th-17th century - Needlepoint (Reticella) Lace Square - 1920.1098 - Cleveland Museum of Art

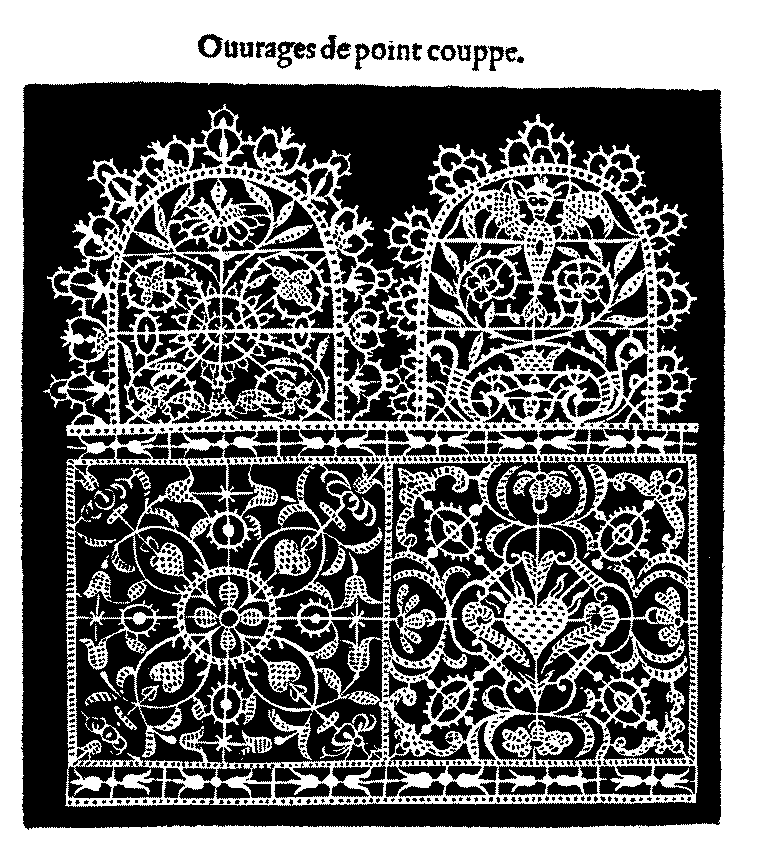
Pattern for reticella or point couppe from Vinciolo's Les Singuliers et Nouveaux Pourtaicts, 1609 reprint of 1587 edition.

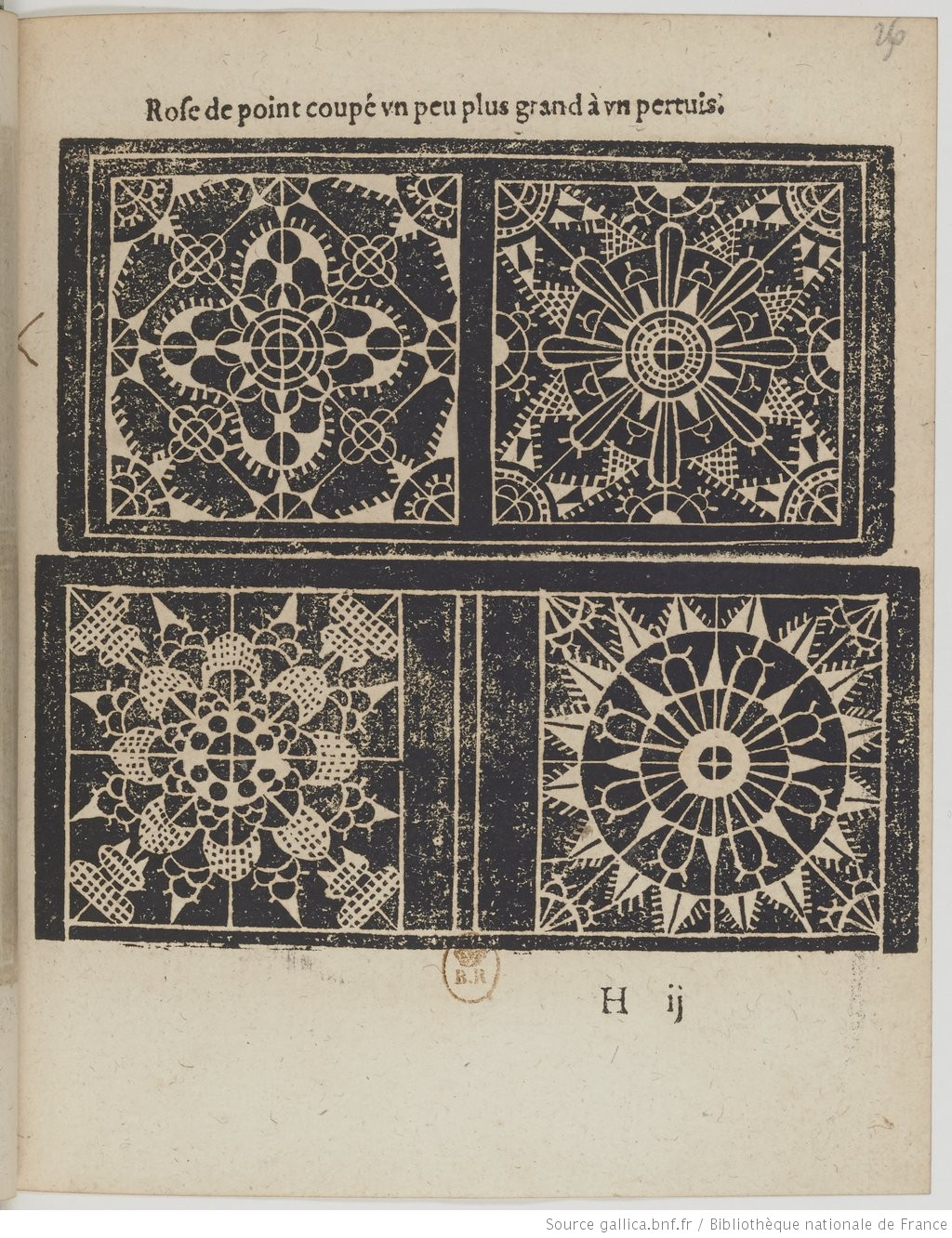
Nouveaux pourtraicts de point coupé

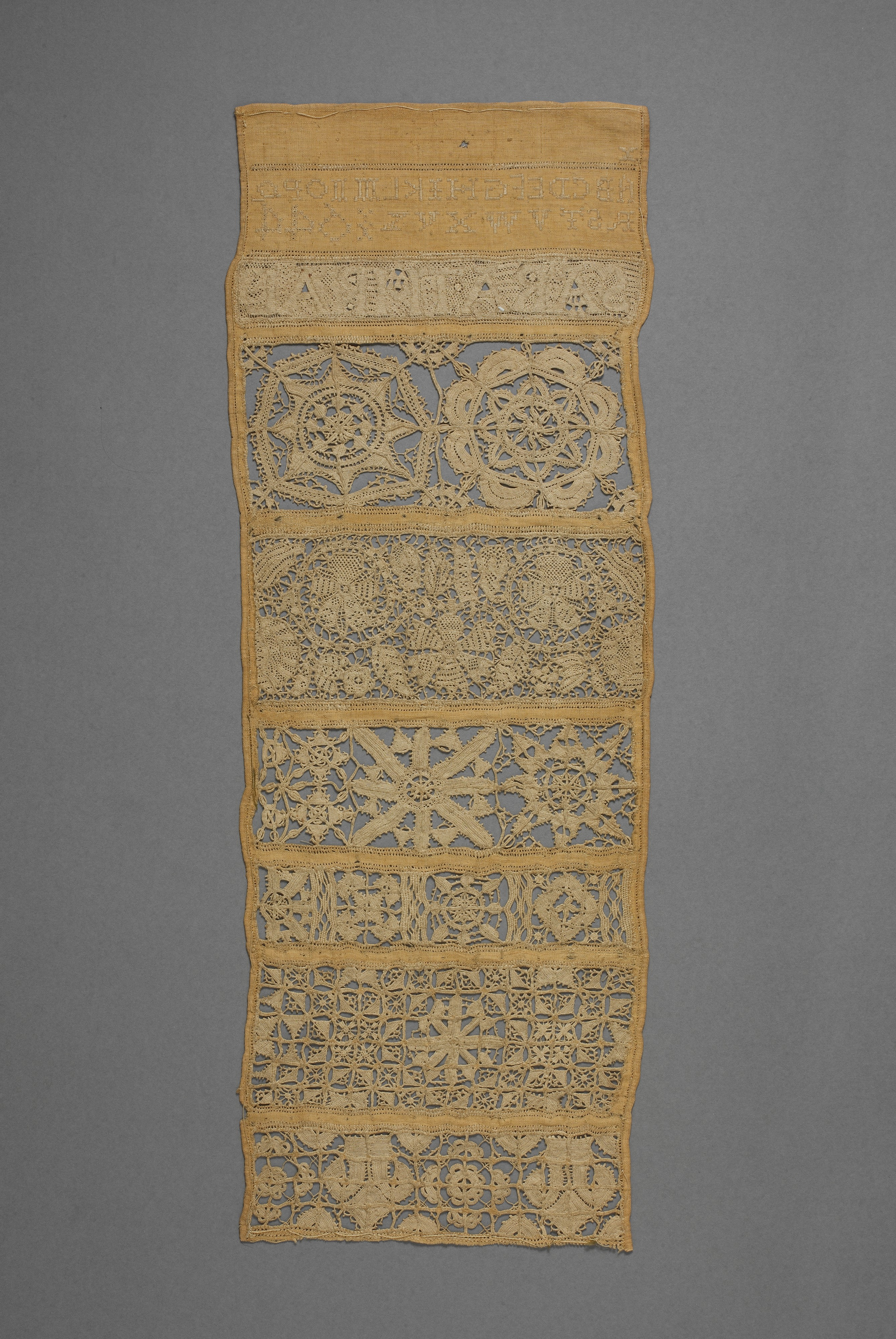
Sampler with needle lace and cutwork MET DP162636

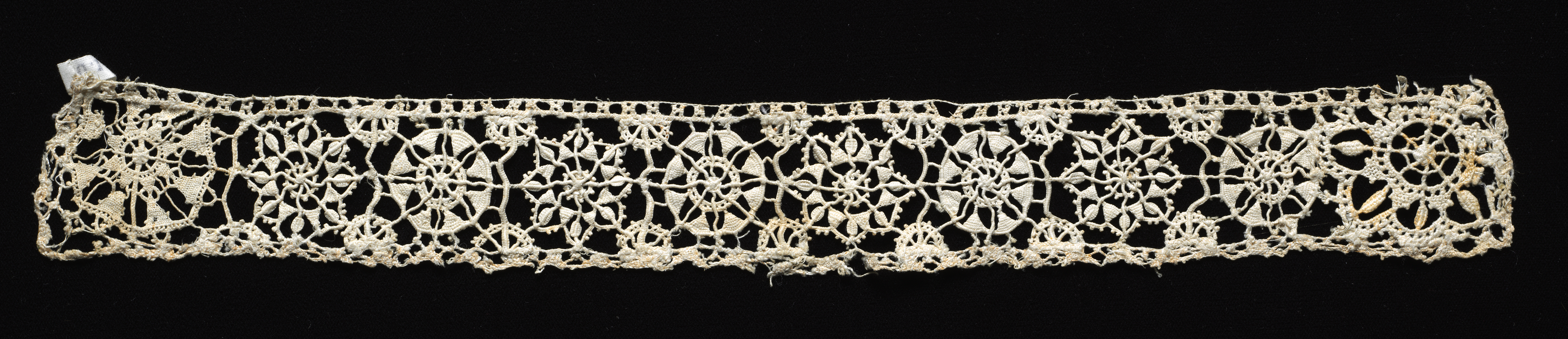
Italy, Venice, 16th century - Needlepoint (Reticella) Lace Insertion - 1920.1073 - Cleveland Museum of Art

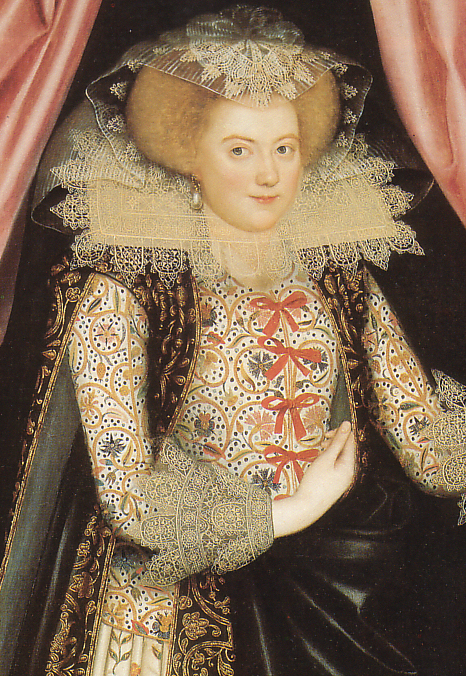
English woman wearing a reticella lace collar and cuffs tinted with yellow starch, c. 1614-1618

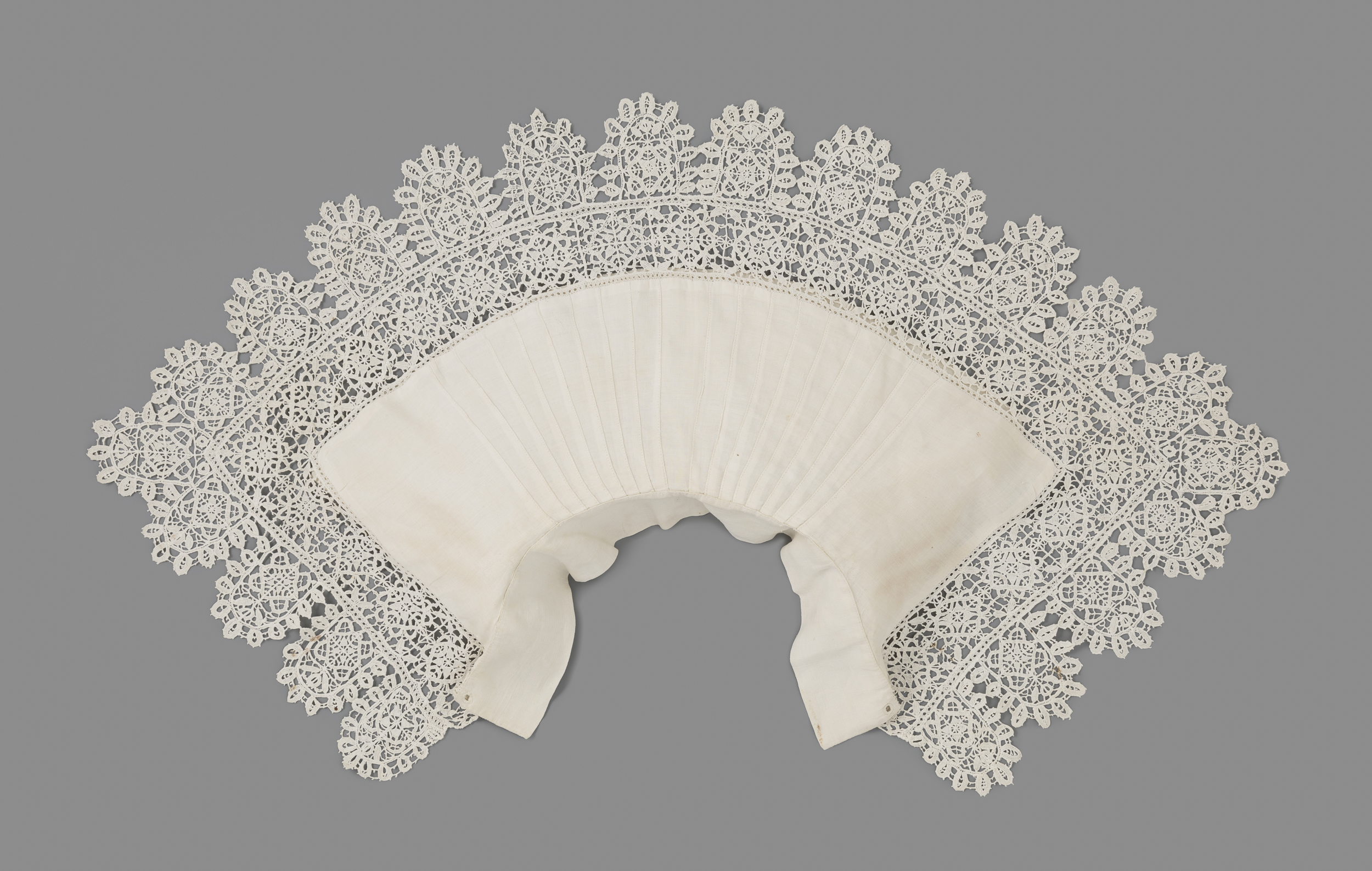
Kraag van linnen met tussenzetsel en schulpstroken in reticella, BK-1978-461

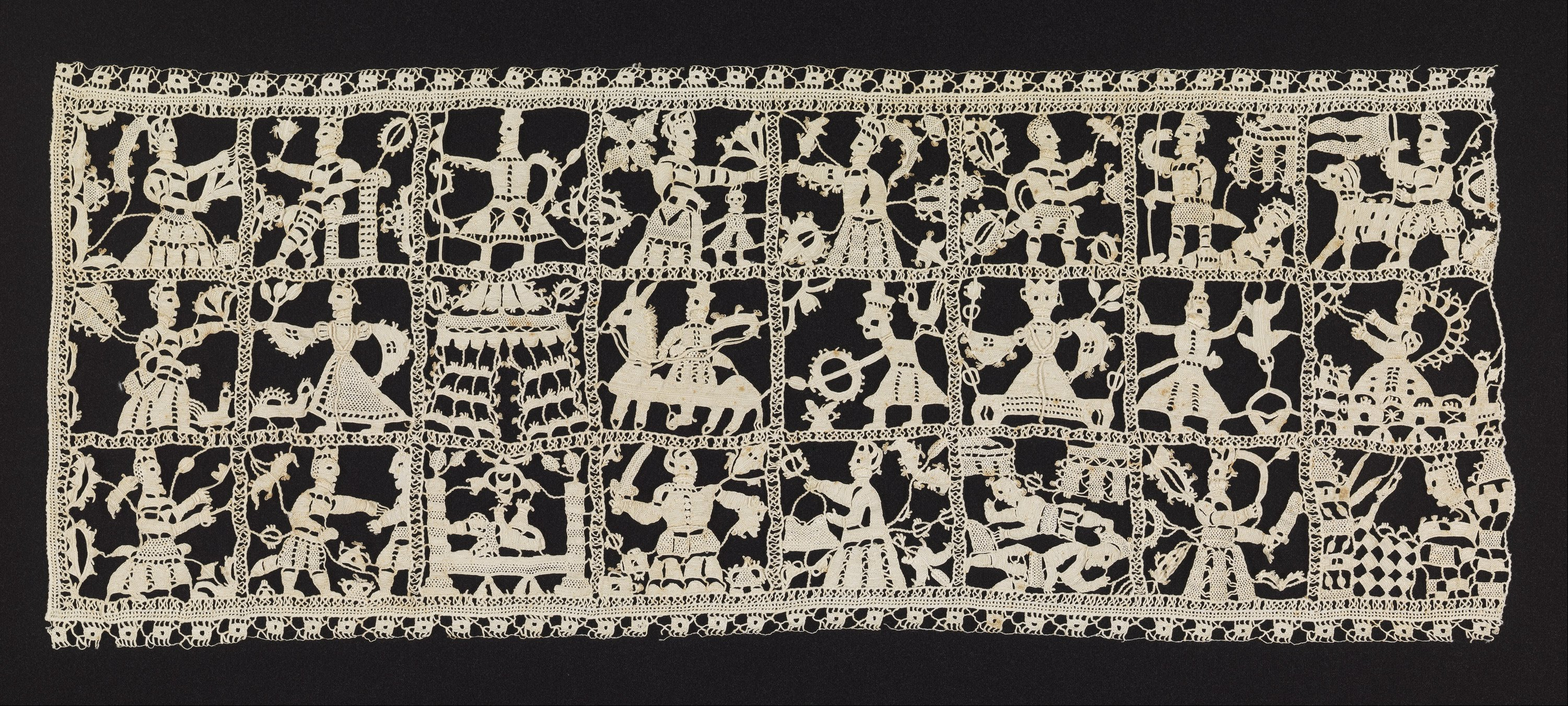
Panel - drawn element work with needle lace, reticella style
