= Buttonhole stitch =

Stitch to reinforce edges or for decoration

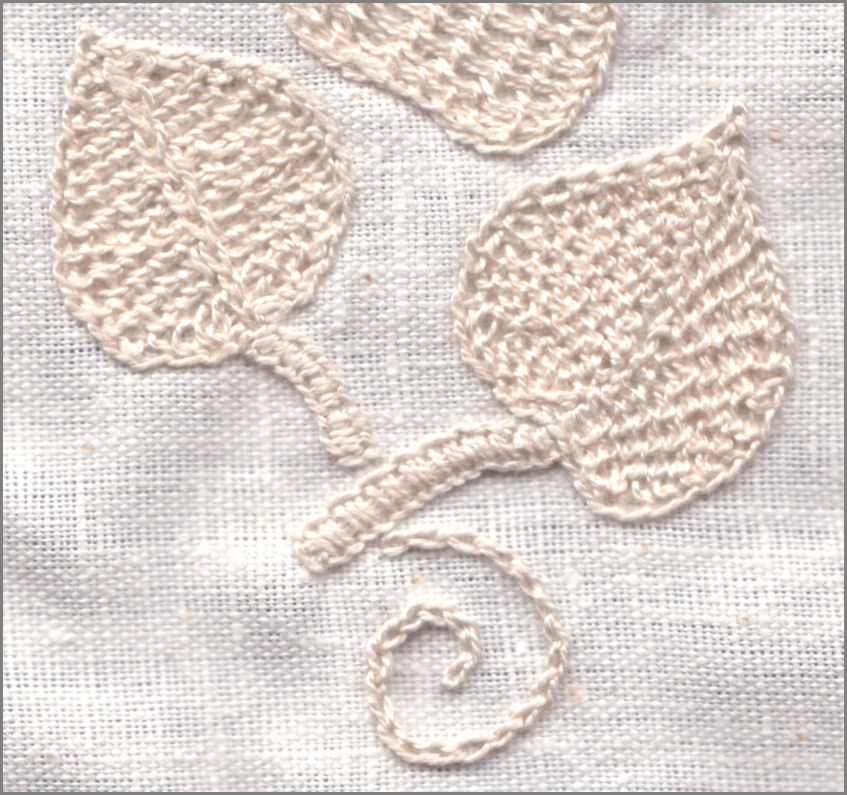
Embroidery with stems in buttonhole and leaves in detached buttonhole stitch, worked in natural perle cotton on cotton-linen fabric, United States, 1990s.

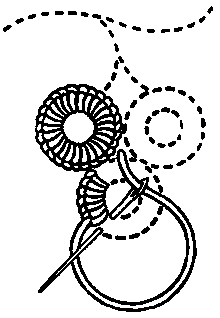
Buttonhole stitch in embroidery

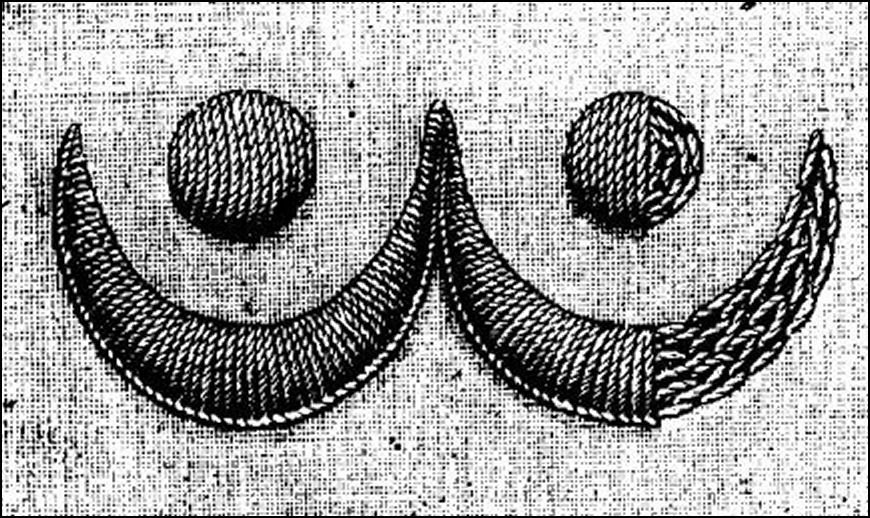
Raised buttonhole scallops, from Isabella Beeton's Beeton's Book of Needlework

Buttonhole stitch and the related blanket stitch are hand-sewing stitches used in tailoring, embroidery, and needle lace-making.

== Applications ==
Traditionally, this stitch has been used to secure the edges of buttonholes. In addition to reinforcing buttonholes and preventing cut fabric from raveling, buttonhole stitches are used to make stems in crewel embroidery, to make sewn eyelets, to attach applique to ground fabric, and as couching stitches. Buttonhole stitch scallops, usually raised or padded by rows of straight or chain stitches, were a popular edging in the 19th century. Buttonhole stitches are also used in cutwork, including Broderie Anglaise, and form the basis for many forms of needlelace. This stitch is well represented on 16th- and 17th-century whitework items. The buttonhole stitch appeared on the Jane Bostocke sampler (1598) which is the earliest, signed sampler known to date and is presently housed in the Victoria and Albert Museum in London.

== Variants ==
Examples of buttonhole or blanket stitches include:

- Blanket stitch
- Buttonhole stitch
- Closed buttonhole stitch, in which the tops of the stitch touch to form triangles
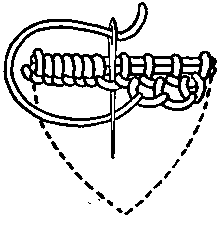
Detached buttonhole stitch

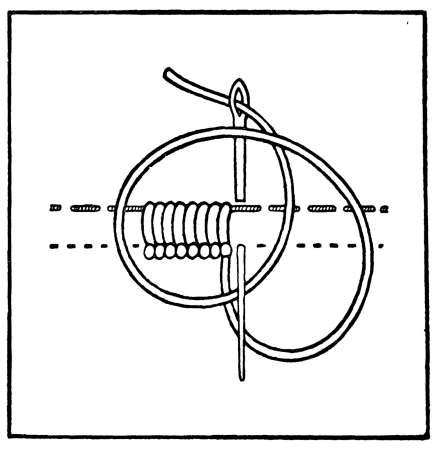
Tailor's buttonhole stitch

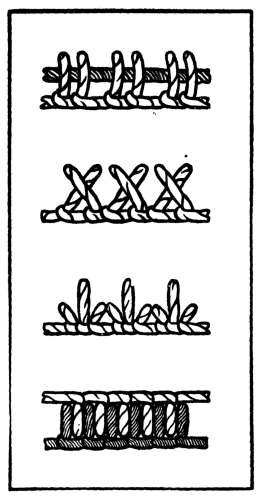
Buttonhole stitch variations

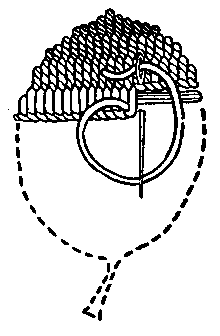
Buttonhole shading

== See also ==
- Embroidery stitch

== Other References ==
- Virginia Churchill Bath, Needlework in America, Viking Press, 1979 ISBN 0-670-50575-7
- S.F.A. Caulfield and B.C. Saward, The Dictionary of Needlework, 1885.
- Mrs. Archibald Christie. Samplers and Stitches, a handbook of the embroiderer's art, London 1920, 1989 facsimile: Batsford, ISBN 0-7134-4796-6.
