= Needle lace =

Lace made with a needle and thread

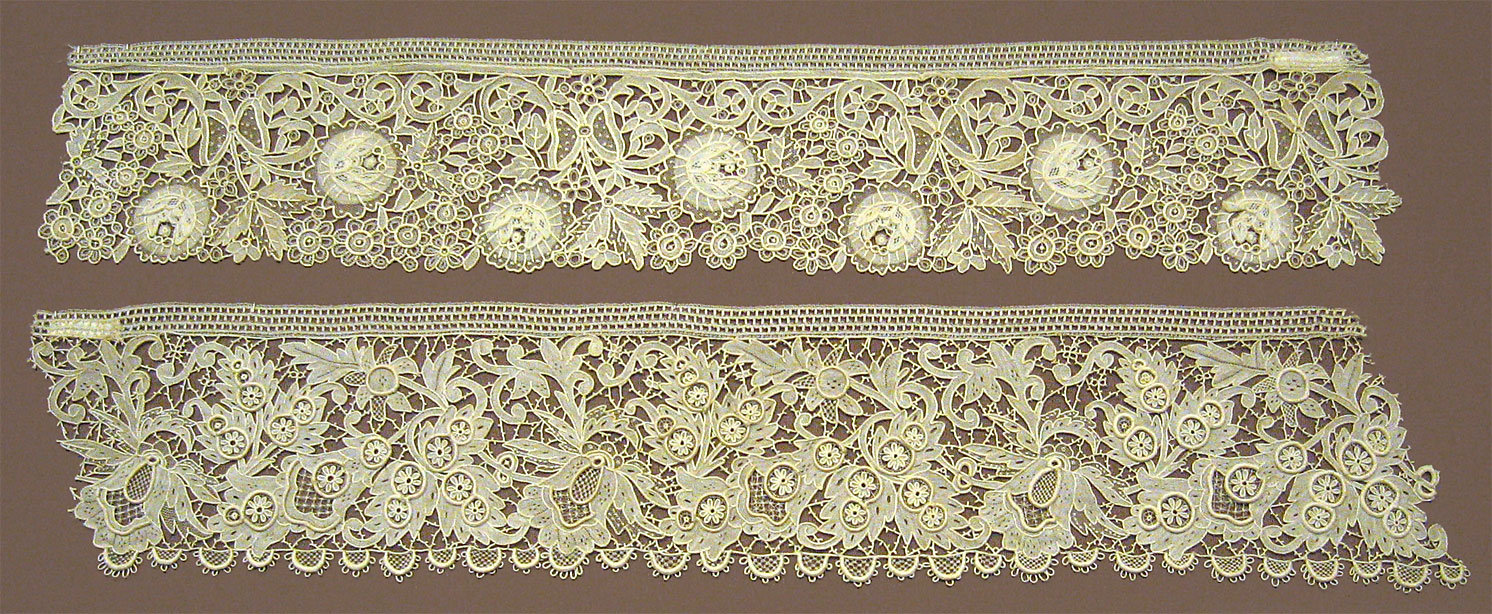
Needle lace borders from the Ore Mountains of Germany in 1884, displayed in the Victoria and Albert Museum

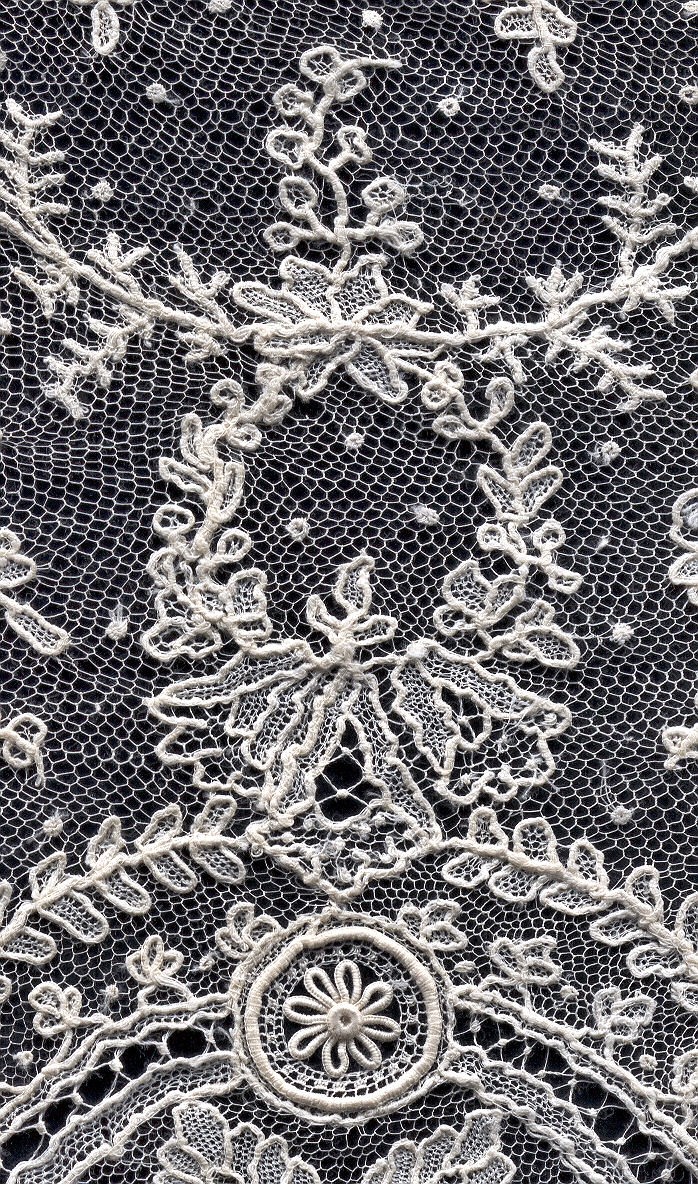
Needle lace, detail

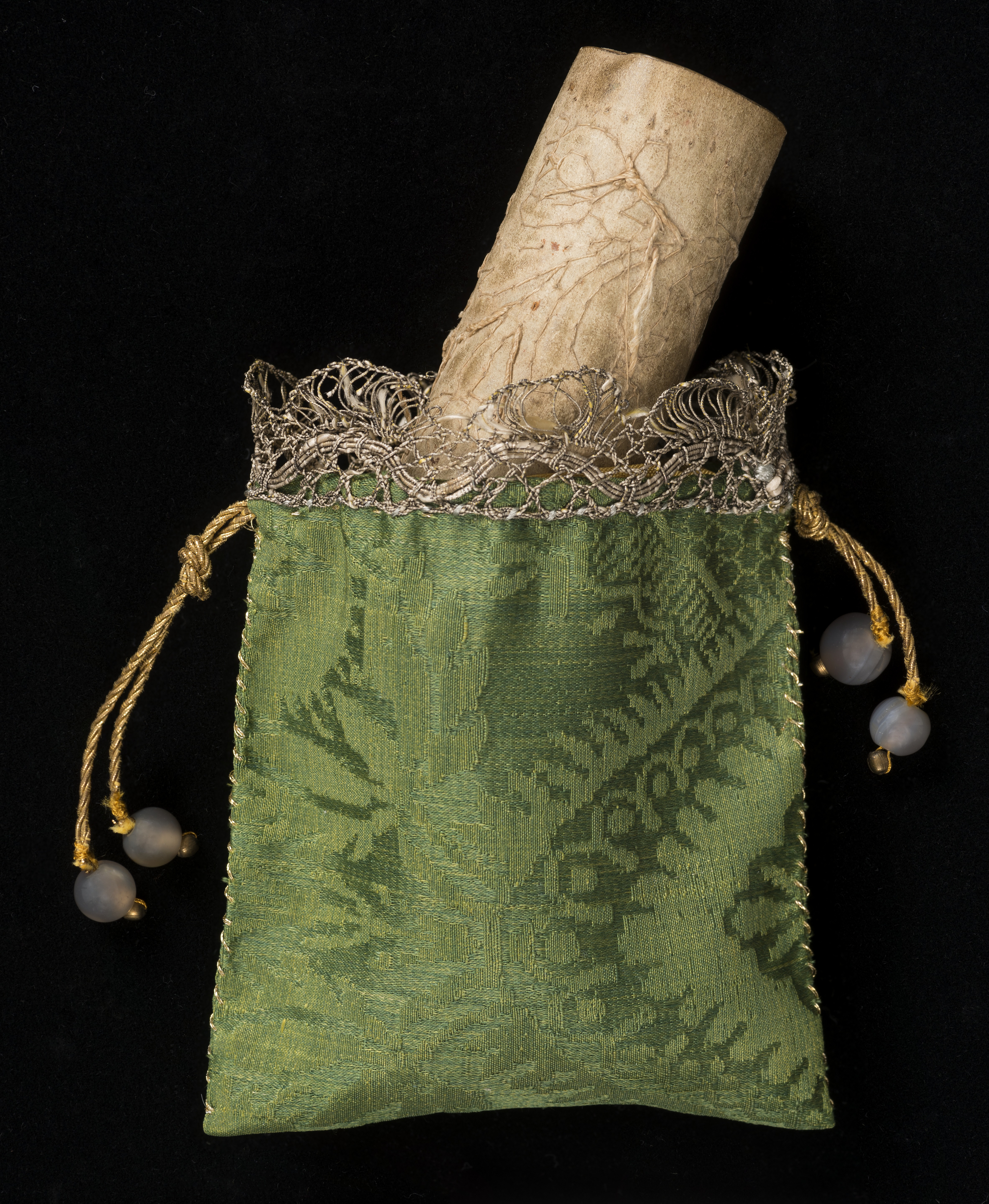
Parchment With Unfinished Needle Lace (England), 17th century (CH 18637569)

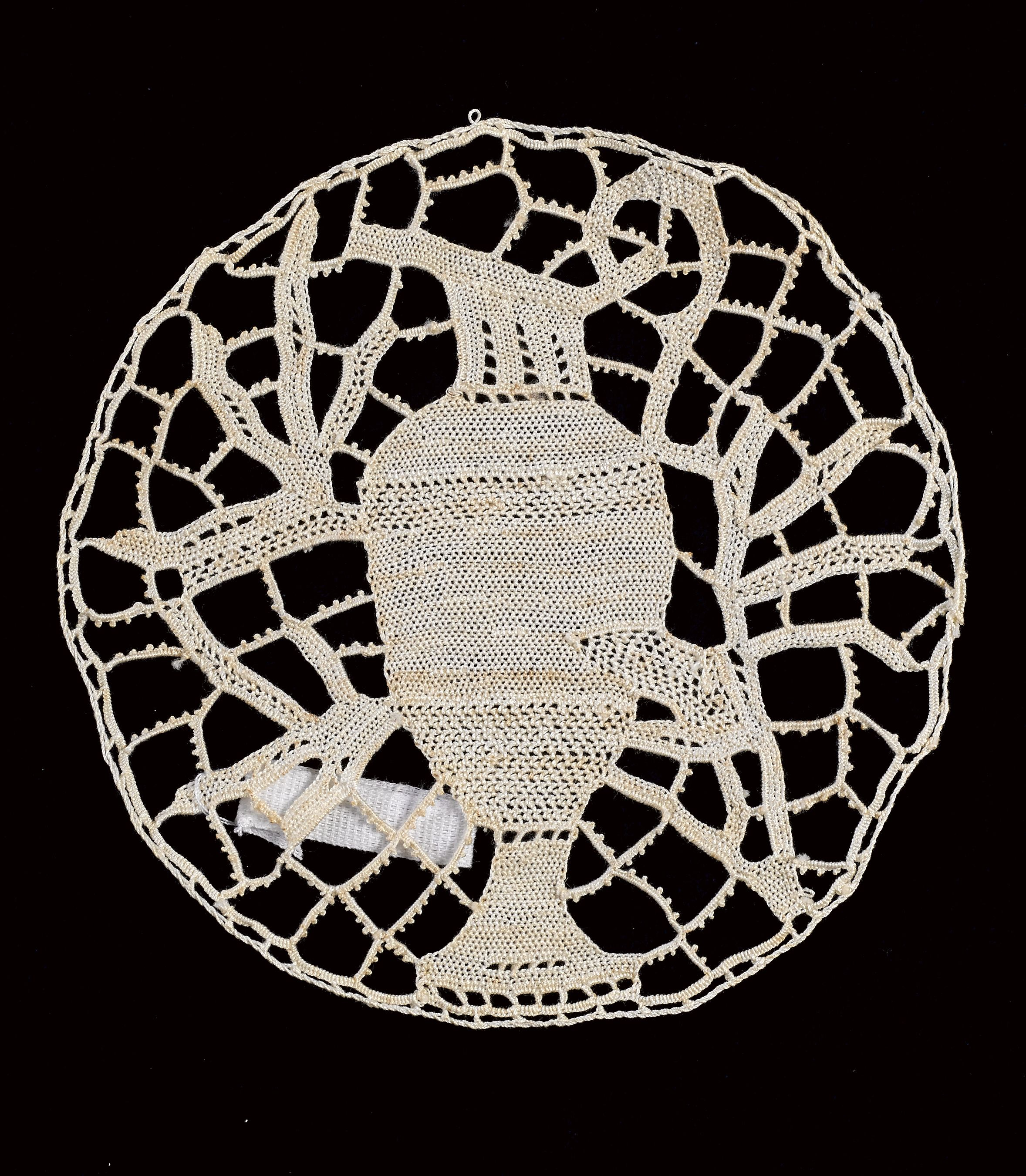
Runner (ST557) - Lace-Needle Lace - MoMu Antwerp

Needle lace is a type of lace created using a needle and thread to create hundreds of small stitches to form the lace itself.

== Origins ==
The origins of needle lace date back to the 15th century and embroidery. Cutwork and drawn work were developed to add interest to white on white embroidery, and the methods used in these techniques led to needle lace. A second expert puts the development of needle lace in the following century, the 16th, in Italy, also stemming from embroidery, the openwork on linen technique called reticella. To show off their wealth in that period in Italy, the aristocracy favored wearing rich cloth embellished by embroidery and braid. As the century progressed, the small areas that were cut from the fabric to highlight the needle lace were replaced by much larger areas of cutwork. The needlework was dependent on remaining threads running vertically and horizontally, leaving squares and rectangles, which led to geometric designs.

Venice was a center of needle lace making in the 1400s, as documented by official records. In the 1500s, city officials decreed that young men in Venice were prohibited from lace wearing until they had turned 25. Lace was a prized possession, appearing in lists of people's assets.

== Materials ==
A variety of styles developed where the work is started by securing heavier guiding threads onto a stiff background (such as thick paper) with stitches that can later be removed. The work is then built up using a variety of stitches—the most basic being a variety of buttonhole or blanket stitch. When the entire area is covered with the stitching, the stay-stitches are released and the lace comes away from the paper.

Needle lace is also used to create the fillings or insertions in cutwork.

== Structure ==
In its basic form, the only equipment and materials used are a needle, thread and scissors. Often there is a supporting substrate that is used to tether the outline stitches for the basic framework, and then many types of stitches will fill in the open spaces subsequently. Many different needle lace styles and traditions have developed over the centuries, and distinctive stitches can characterize different styles. Many needle lace texts are available to assist contemporary lacemakers to reproduce the classic stitches. Modern lacemakers can also explore contemporary design and novel uses for needle lace beyond the traditional reproduction work.

The Royal School of Needlework contains a stitch library of many types of stitching, including some needle lace techniques. For example, Hollie Point structure and steps can be examined in detail.
