= Adelaida Ferré Gomis =

Spanish historian, lace maker, teacher, folklorist (1881–1955)

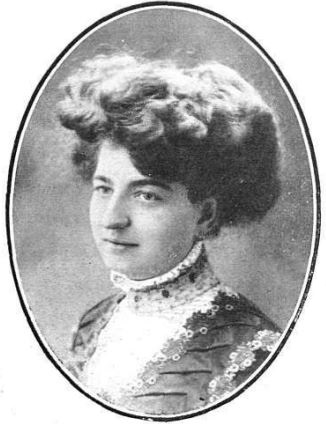
- Born: 24 February 1881; Barcelona, Spain
- Died: 9 March 1955 (aged 74); Barcelona
- Education: Municipal Conservatory of Barcelona
- Known for: historian, teacher, and folklorist associated with lace-making in Catalonia

Adelaida Ferré i Gomis de Ruíz de Narváez (Barcelona, 24 February 1881 - Barcelona, 9 March 1955) was a Spanish historian, teacher, and folklorist associated with lace-making in Catalonia. In addition to needle lace, Ferré was interested in Esperanto and participated in at least one international congress on the subject.

== Early life and education ==
Adelaida Ferré Gomis was the daughter of the painter and decorator Pere Ferré. Her education began at the Escola Normal Superior de Mestres before attending the Municipal Conservatory of Barcelona and the Escola d'Institutrius. There, she had as a teacher the folklorist es:Rossend Serra i Pagès.

Between the years 1902 and 1915, she received artistic training at the Escola de la Llotja. She combined her artistic studies with those at the ca:Institut Català de les Arts del Llibre and the es:Centro de Cultura de Mujeres Francesca Bonnemaison, where she was able to perfect her knowledge of lace-making and other crafts. One of Adelaide's teachers at this institute was es:José Fiter e Inglés, who awakened Ferré's interest in the history of needle lace.

== Career ==
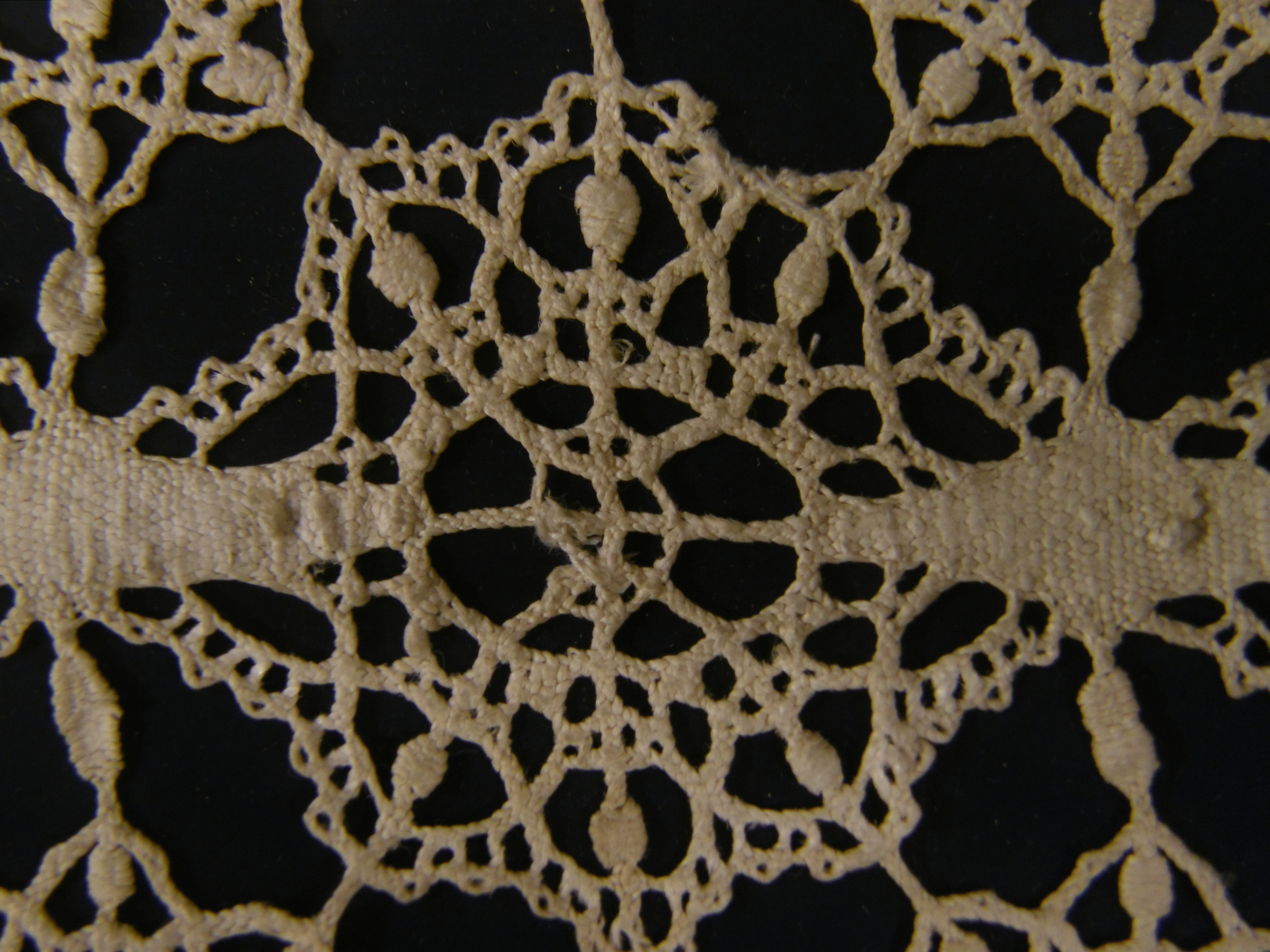
bobbin lace

embroidered lace

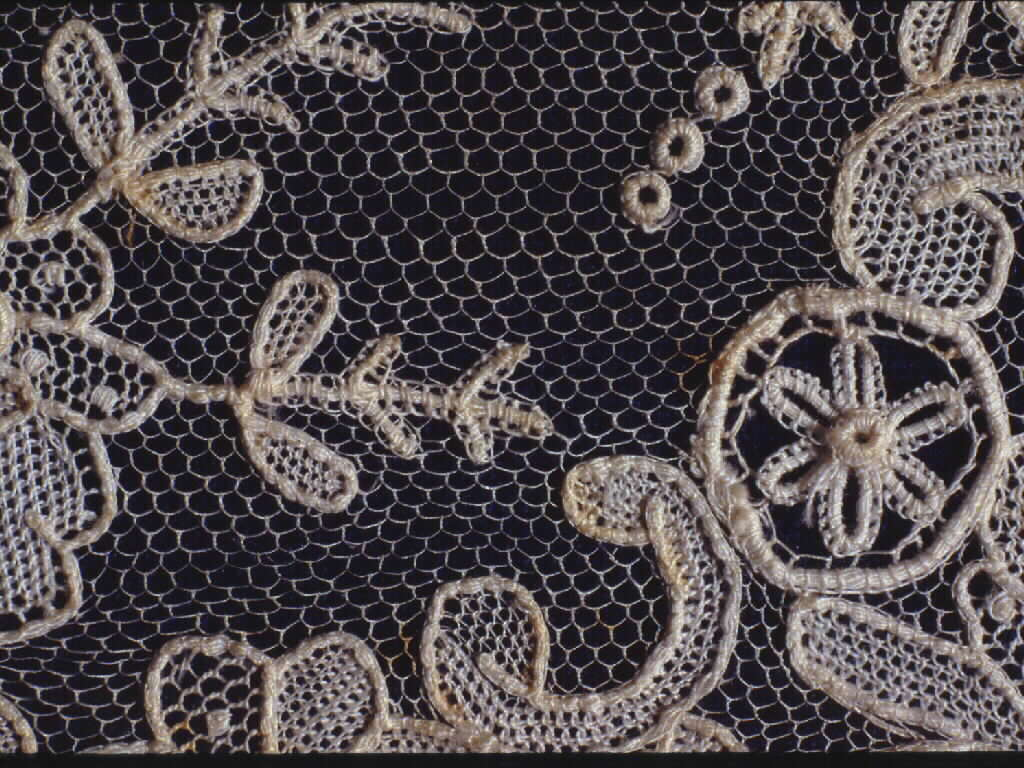
needle lace

During these years, her works were also exhibited in important exhibitions, such as the Exposición de retratos y dibujos antiguos y modernos that took place in 1910 at the Palau de les Belles Arts, organized by the Barcelona City Council. She also participated in the Exposició d'Art de Barcelona in 1920 and in the Exposició de ferros artístics organized by the Guild of Locksmiths and Ferrers and the Commonwealth of Catalonia at the es:Galerías Layetanas the following year.

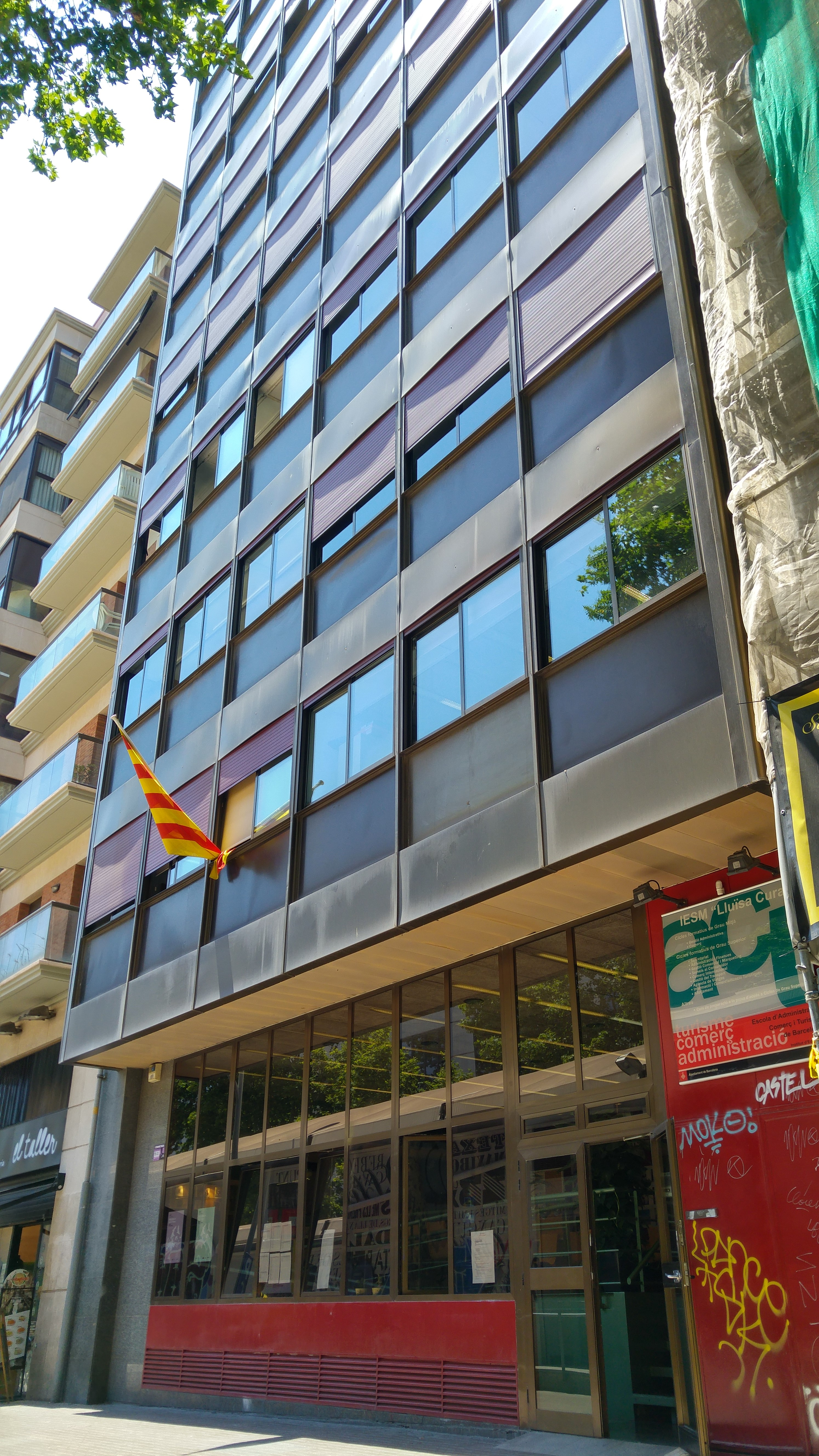
Institut Lluïsa Cura

Ferré focused both the practice of labor and the plastic arts in teaching. She taught artistic drawing and engraving at the Municipal School of Arts in the eighth district of Barcelona; modeling and engraving at the Municipal School for the blind, mute and other disabled; art history at the Women's Professional School of the Provincial Government of Barcelona; and embossed leather classes at the Saint George's School for Ladies in Barcelona and at Acción Femenina. But where Ferré spent a large part of her professional life was at the Municipal School of Trades for Women, later refounded under the name of Lluïsa Cura School (now Institut Lluïsa Cura). There, she taught embroidered lace and needle lace since 1911. She was appointed director in 1942 and retired after ten years.

Ferré's pedagogic spirit, influenced by Serra i Pagès, is clearly evident in the research she carried out on any aspect related to textile activities considered feminine, especially everything that refers to lace. Always interested in dissemination, Ferré not only practiced it through teaching in the classrooms but also in numerous conferences and in the preparation of articles.

Ferré is the historian of lace in Spain. Apart from the rigor and seriousness of her work, its relevance lies in the fact that, at the time she began to theorize about this art, the respective bibliography produced in Catalonia was very scarce. In the first stage, her studies appeared in publications such as Joventut, Art jove, and La Veu de Catalunya, among others. Between the years 1931 and 1948, Ferré's main studies appeared in the Butlletí del Museu d'Art de Barcelona, an institution in which she collaborated by documenting its textile collection.

Ferré's research greatly contributed to tracing the history of textile production both within and outside Catalonia. Ferré also documented and cataloged the collections of the Barcelona art museums directed by es:Joaquim Folch i Torres. In her articles Ferré showed herself as a connoisseur of the past and present of bobbin lace in Catalonia and in the rest of Europe, treating the techniques, folklore, history and lexicon of bobbin lace in depth.

Like Joan Amades and other prominent folklorists, Ferré was also interested in the international language Esperanto and in 1909, she participated in the fifth international congress of this language, held in Barcelona.

== Legacy ==
In the present day, Ferré is remembered for having been, in a certain way and together with Francesca Bonnemaison, the origin of the ca:Escola de Puntaires de Barcelona. It was Ferré who commissioned the sisters Antònia and Montserrat Raventós Ventura to give lace classes at the Lluïsa Cura School, of which Ferré was the director. Ferré also had a close relationship with the es:Fomento de las Artes y del Diseño and the Centre Excursionista de Catalunya. Her publications are held by the Fishing Museum of Palamós and the Library of Catalonia. The Marès Lace Museum hold two samples of bobbin lace designed by Ferré and made by ca:Clotilde Pascual i Fibla which were displayed in the 1918 exhibition in Barcelona at the Palau de les Belles Arts organized by the Fomento de las Artes y del Diseño.
