= Net (device) =

Grid-like structure of threads or yarns

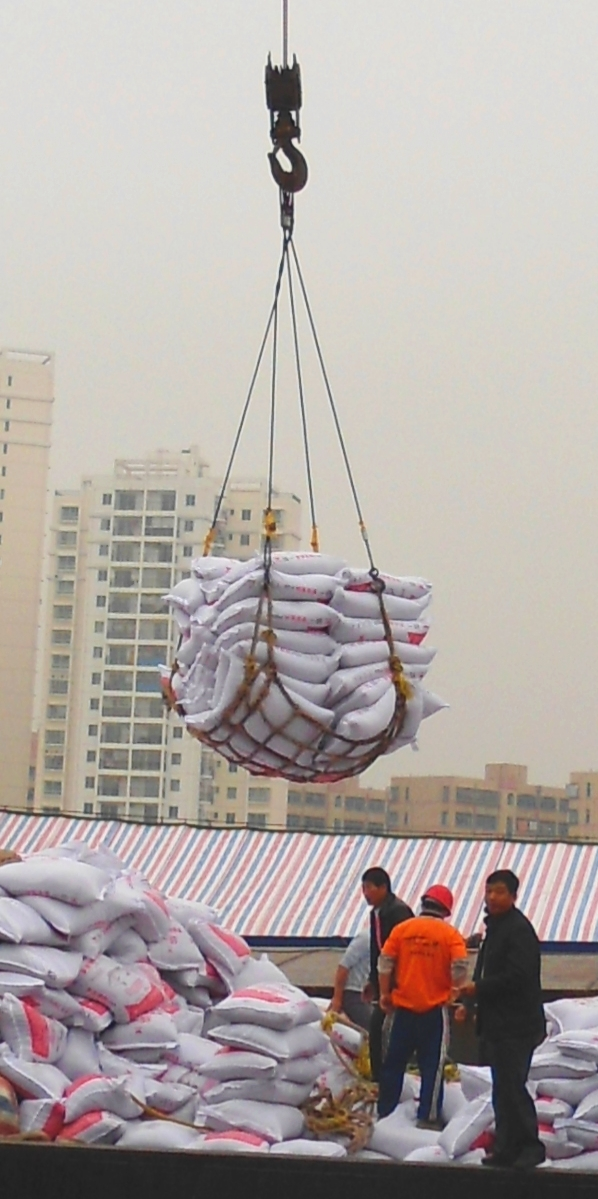
A cargo net being used to unload sacks from a ship at Haikou New Port, Haikou City, Hainan, China

A net comprises threads or yarns knotted and twisted into a grid-like structure which blocks the passage of large items, while letting small items and fluids pass. It requires less material than something sheet-like, and provides a degree of transparency, as well as flexibility and lightness.

Nets have been constructed by human beings since at least the Mesolithic period for use in capturing or retaining things. Their open structure provide lightness and flexibility that allow them to be carried and manipulated with relative ease, making them valuable for methodical tasks such as hunting, fishing, sleeping, and carrying.

== History ==
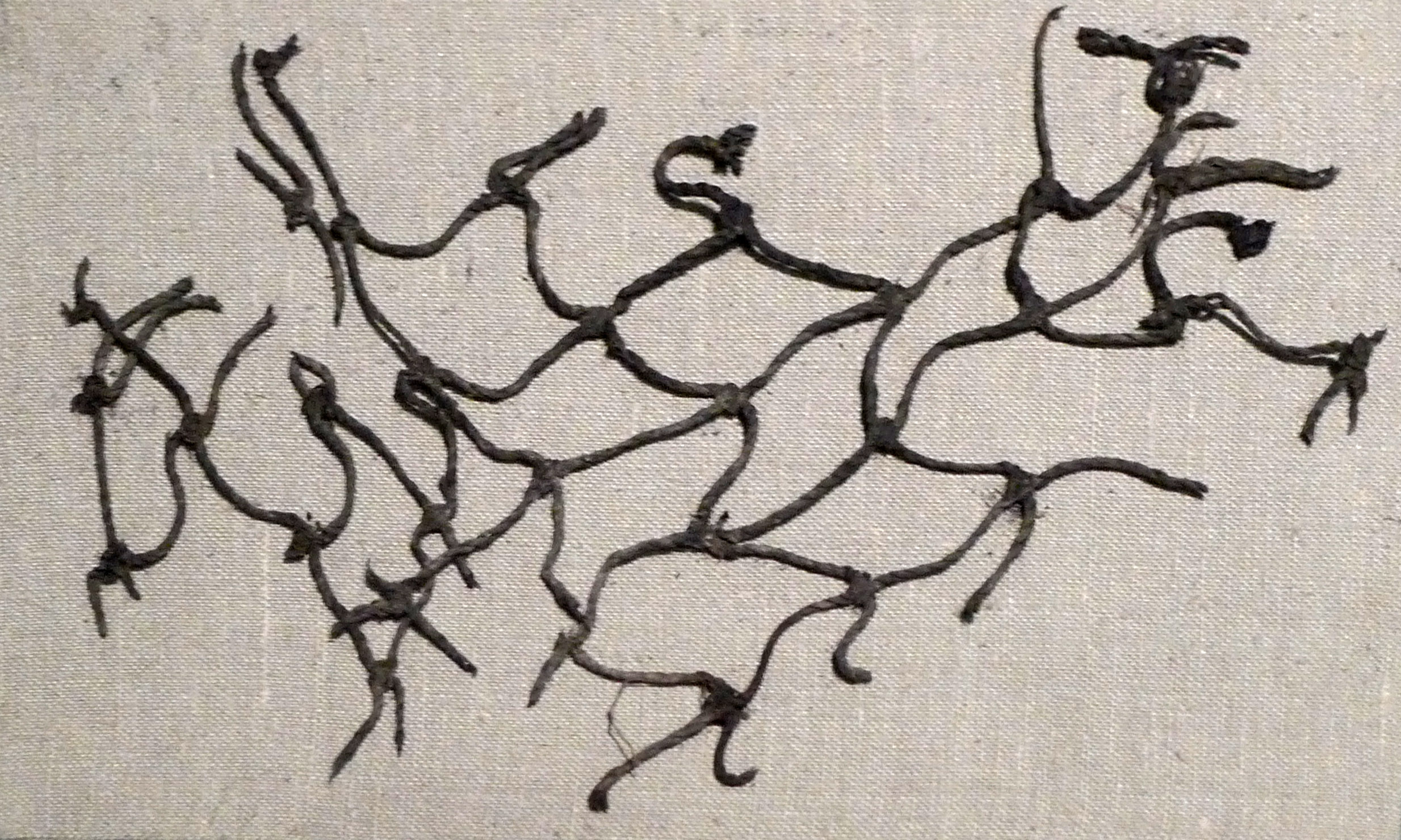
A fragment of Neolithic fishing net.

The oldest nets found are from the Mesolithic era, but nets may have existed in the Upper Paleolithic era. Nets are typically made of perishable materials and leave little archeological record. Some nets are preserved in ice or bogs, and there are also clay impressions of nets.

== Making and repairing nets ==
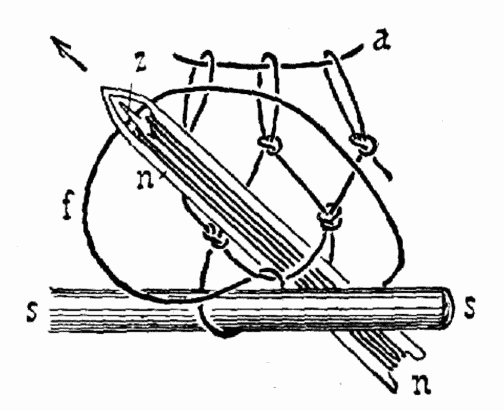
One method of making nets is by tying sheet bends using a netting needle and a gauge. Key: *a) head rope *f) loop of the sheet bend being tied *n) netting shuttle *s) gauge *z) tongue of the netting shuttle (makes it easier to load the twine so that it does not twist as it is used)

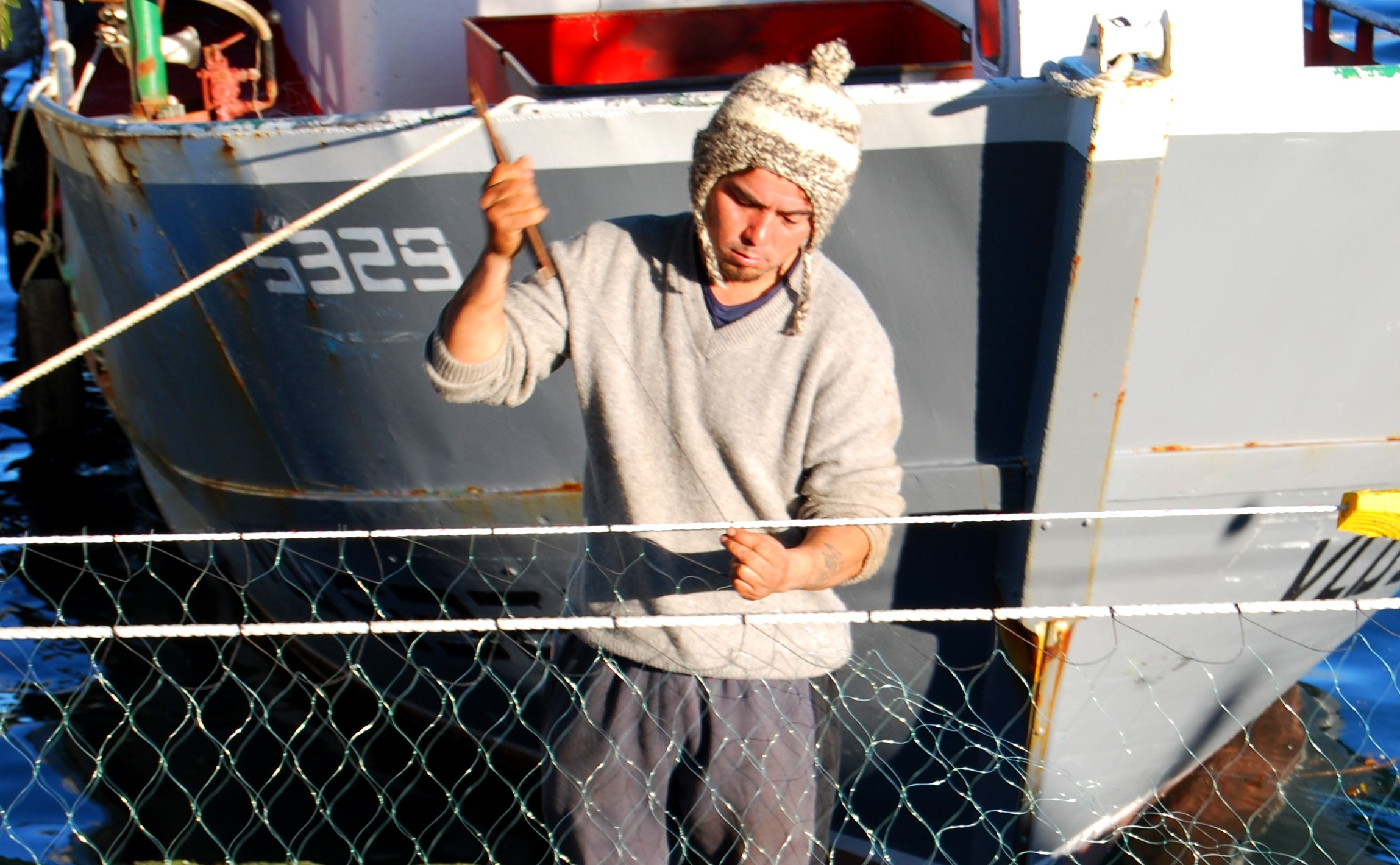
Mending a net; binding a length of net to a new head rope. Note that, unusually, the gauge of the row being worked is larger than the gauge of the rest of the net.

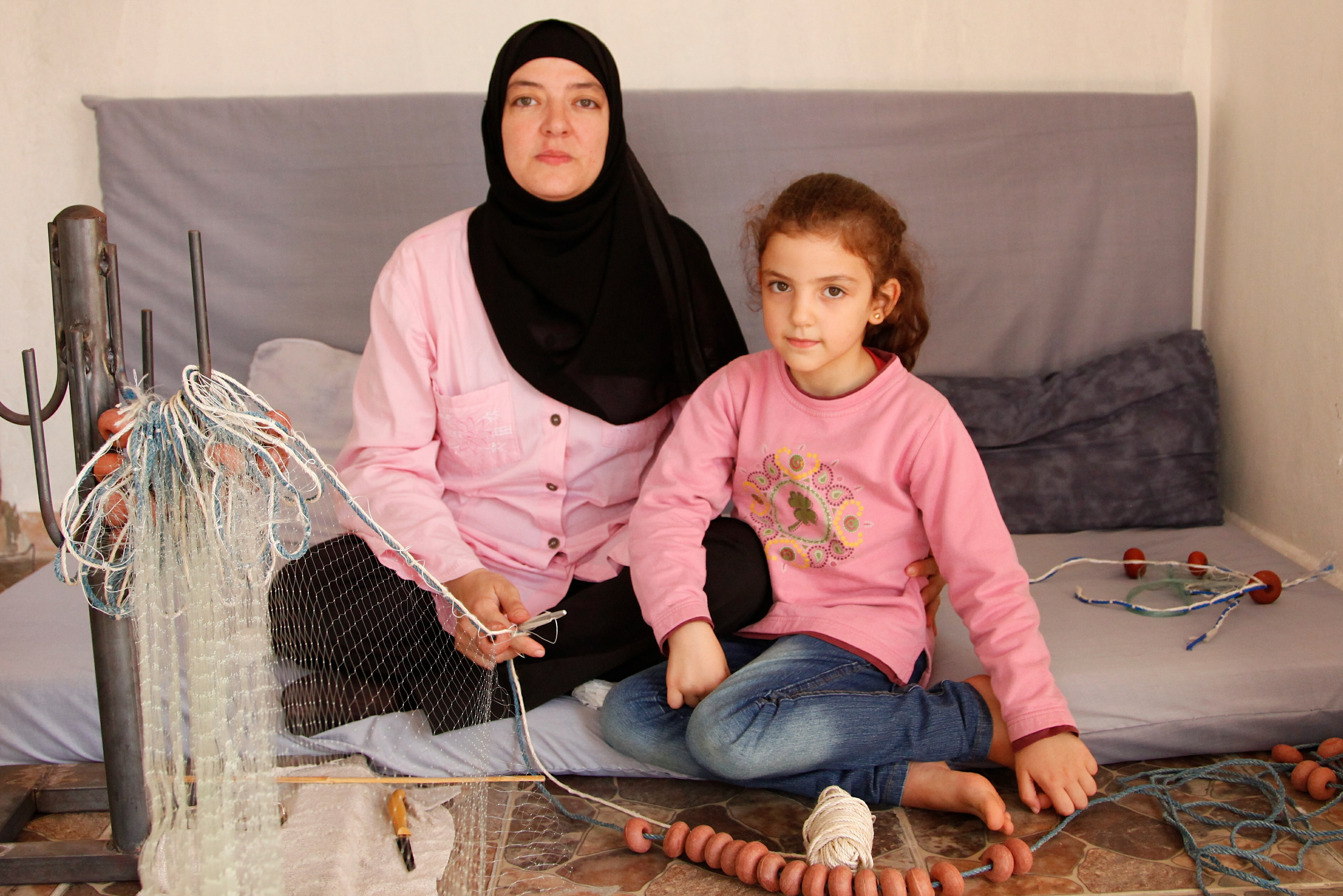
Some nets are still made by hand. This 2013 image shows a Syrian refugee in Lebanon in her home, manually knotting a fishing net intended for sale.

Originally, all nets were made by hand. Construction begins from a single point for round nets such as purse nets, net bags, or hair nets, but square nets are usually started from a headrope. A line is tied to the headrope at regular intervals, forming a series of loops. This can be done using slipped overhand knots or other knots, such as clove hitches. Subsequent rows are then worked using sheet bends, as shown in the diagram, or another knot. Some nets, such as hammocks, may be looped rather than knotted.

To avoid hauling a long length of loose twine through each knot, the twine is wound onto a netting shuttle or netting needle. This must be done correctly to prevent it twisting as it is used, but makes net production much faster. A gauge – often a smooth stick – is used to keep the loops the same size and the mesh even. The first and last rows are generally made using a half-size gauge, so that the edges of the net will be smooth. There are also knot-free nets.

Some nets are still shaped by their end users, although nets are now often knotted by machine.

When a hole is ripped in a net, there are fewer holes in it than before the net was ripped. However, the stress concentration at the edges of the hole often causes it to tear further, making timely repairs important. Mending nets by hand is still an important skill for those who work with them.

== Materials ==
Nets may be made using almost any sort of fiber. Traditional net materials varied with what was locally available; early European fishing nets were often made of linen, for instance. Longer-lasting synthetics are now fairly universal. Nylon monofilament nets are transparent, and are therefore often used for fishing and trapping.

== Structural properties ==
Finishing a Mayan hammock, which is twisted rather than knotted.

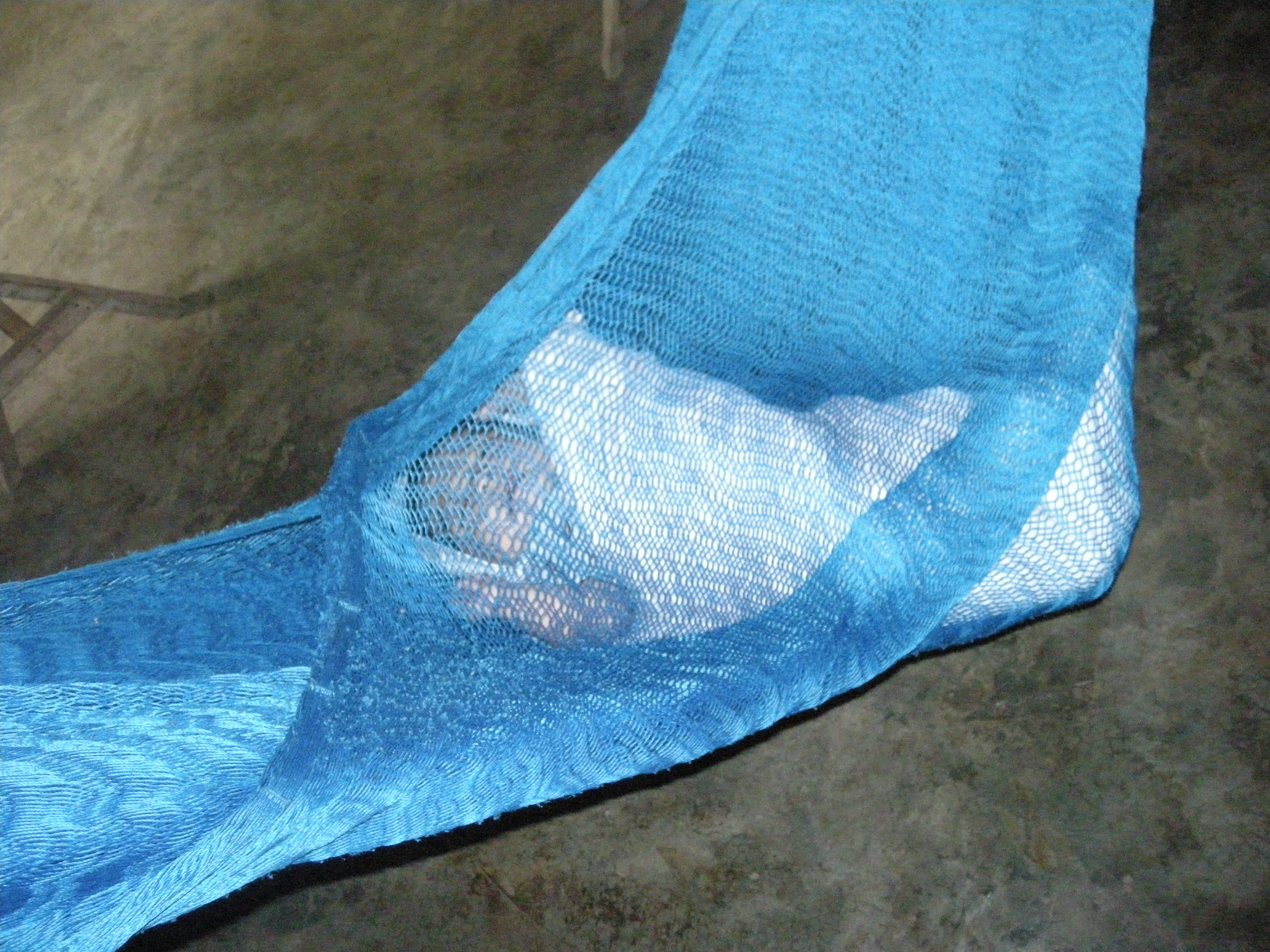
The twisted net of a Mayan hammock is very stretchy, letting it hold this sleeping baby securely.

Nets, like fabric, stretch less along their constituent strands (the "bars" between knots) than diagonally across the gaps in the mesh. They are, so to speak, made on the bias. The choice of material used also affects the structural properties of the net. Nets are designed and constructed for their specific purpose by modifying the parameters of the weave and the material used. Safety nets, for example, must decelerate the person hitting them gradually, usually by having a concave-upwards stress–strain curve, where the amount of force required to stretch the net increases the further the net is stretched.

== Uses ==
=== Transport ===
Examples include cargo nets and net bags. Some vegetables, like onions, are often shipped in nets.

=== Sports ===
Nets are used in sporting goals and in games such as football, basketball, bossaball and ice hockey. A net separates opponents in various net sports such as volleyball, tennis, badminton, and table tennis, where the ball or shuttlecock must go over the net to remain in play. A net also may be used for safety during practice, as in cricket.

=== Capturing animals ===
Nets for capturing animals include fishing nets, butterfly nets, bird netting, and trapping nets such as purse and long nets. Some, like mist nets, rocket nets, and netguns, are designed not to harm the animals caught. Camouflage nets may also be used.

=== Furnishings ===
Hammocks, safety nets, and mosquito nets are net-based. Some furniture includes a net stretched on a frame. Multihull boats may have net trampolines strung between their hulls.

=== Clothing ===
Hair nets, net lace, and net embroidery are sartorial nets.

=== Armed conflict ===
Anti-submarine nets and anti-torpedo nets can be laid by net-laying ships.

== See also ==
- Net (textile)
