= Embroidered lace =

Lace worked with needle and thread on a ground fabric

Embroidered lace is embroidered on a base using a needle. The base varies according to the type.

Many techniques use a net, either woven or knotted. The net varies:

- Woven fabric with threads removed to make a grid (Reticella, Buratto)
- Machine made hexagonal net (Limerick, Needlerun net, Tambour)
- Knotted square net (either hand-made or machine-made) (Filet)

Sol laces are embroidered in a circular pattern on radiating spokes of threads. These include Tenerife lace and Ñandutí lace.

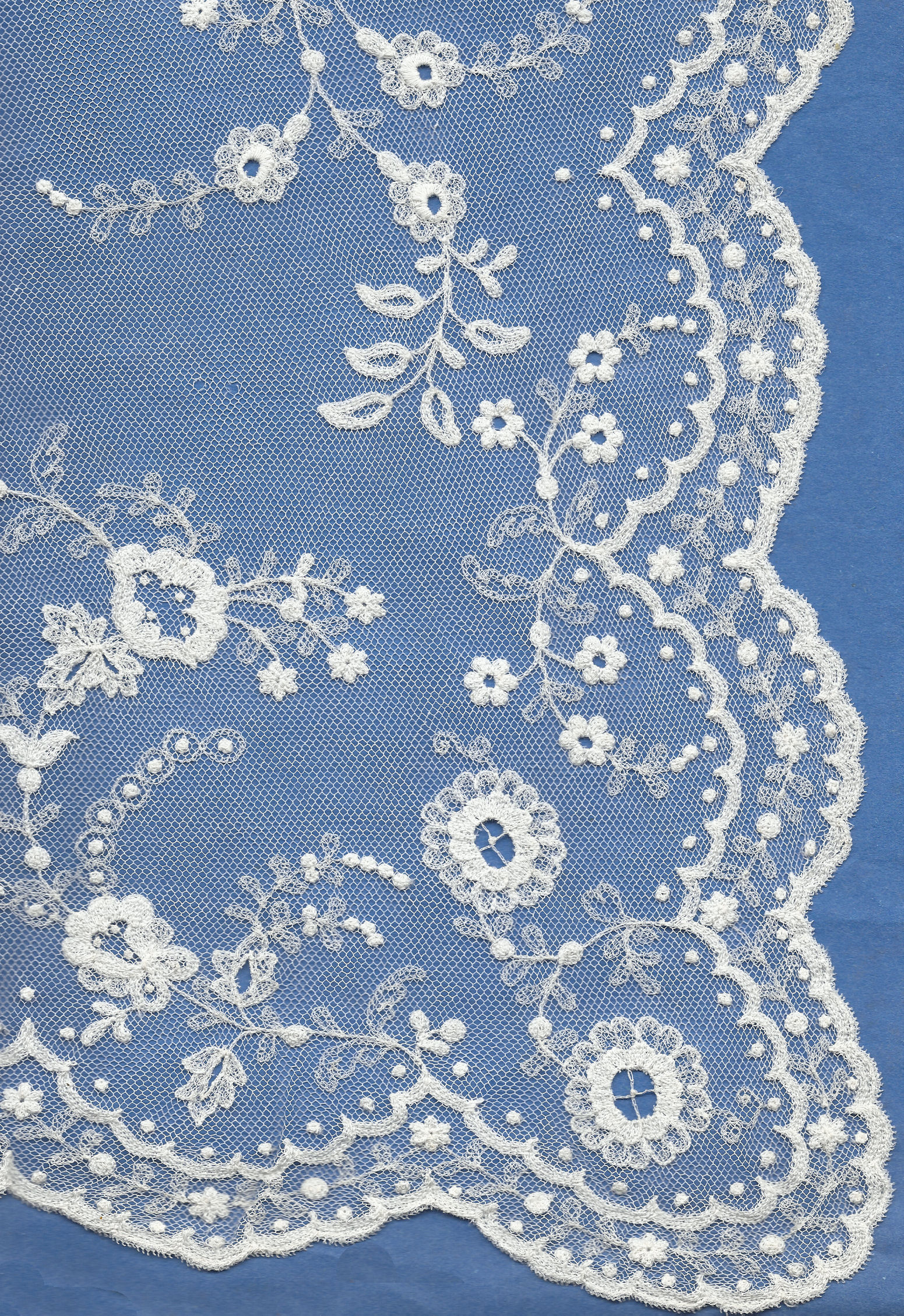
19C Limerick lace wedding veil

Filet lace being worked.

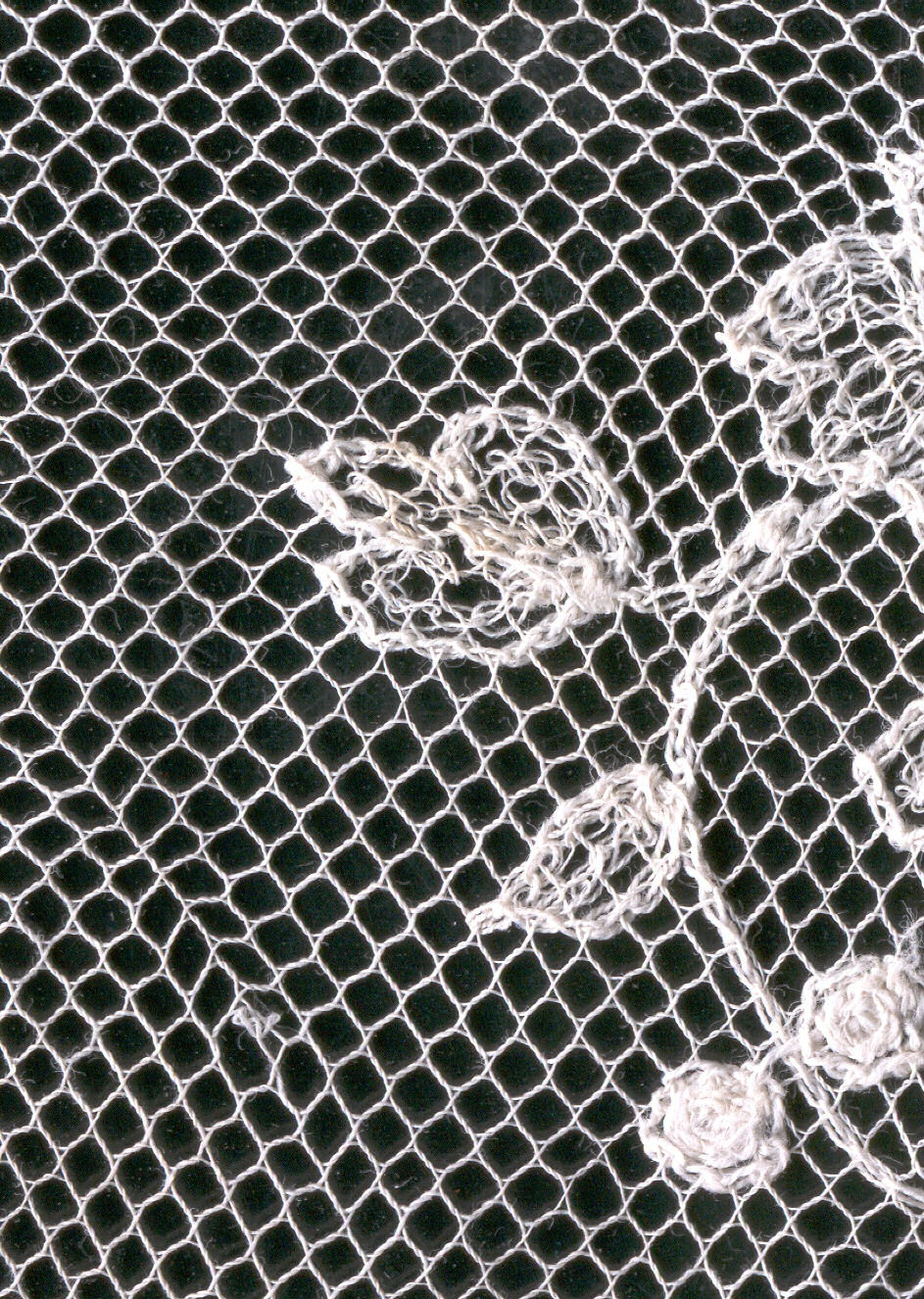
Tambour lace from Lier

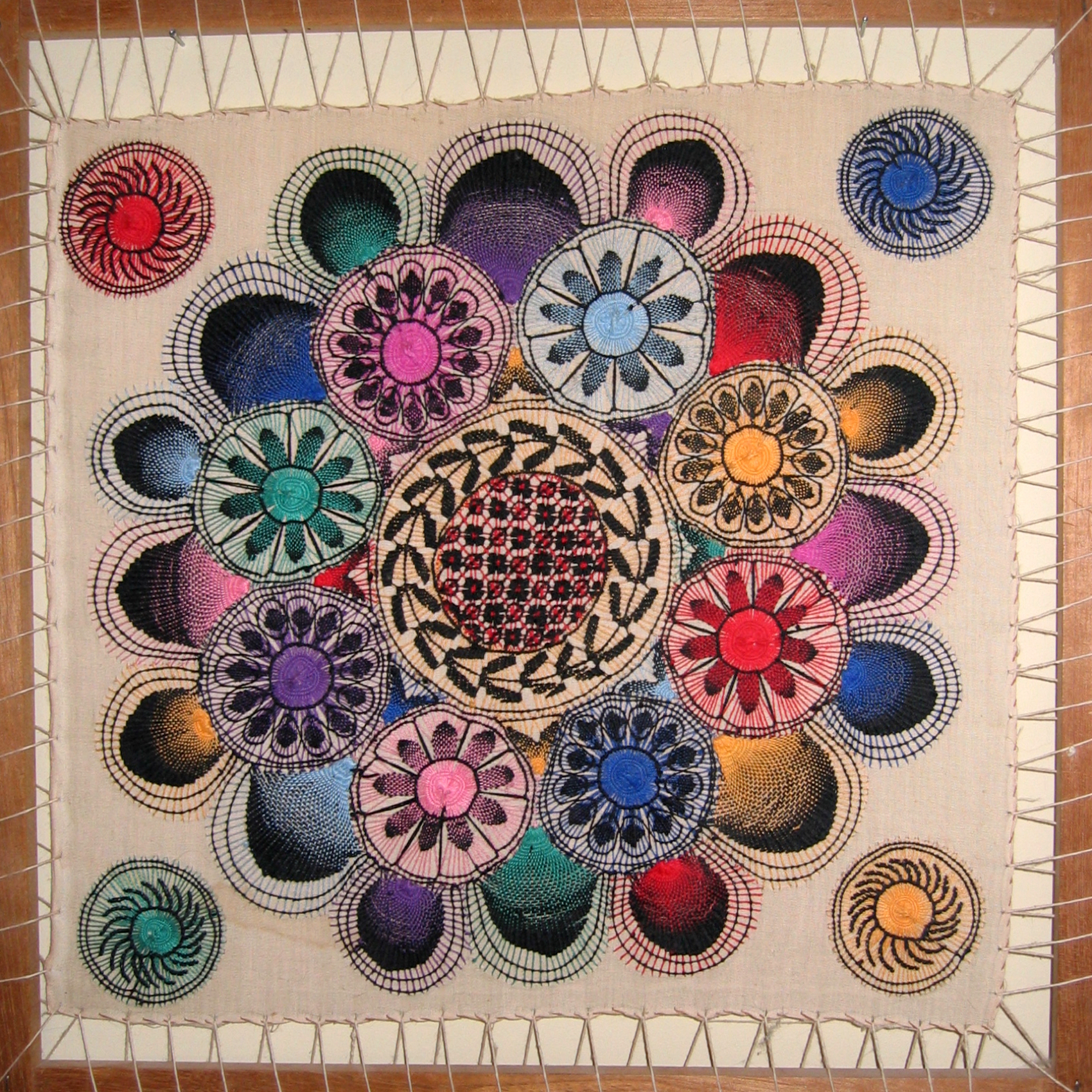
Ñandutí lace from Asunción Paraguay

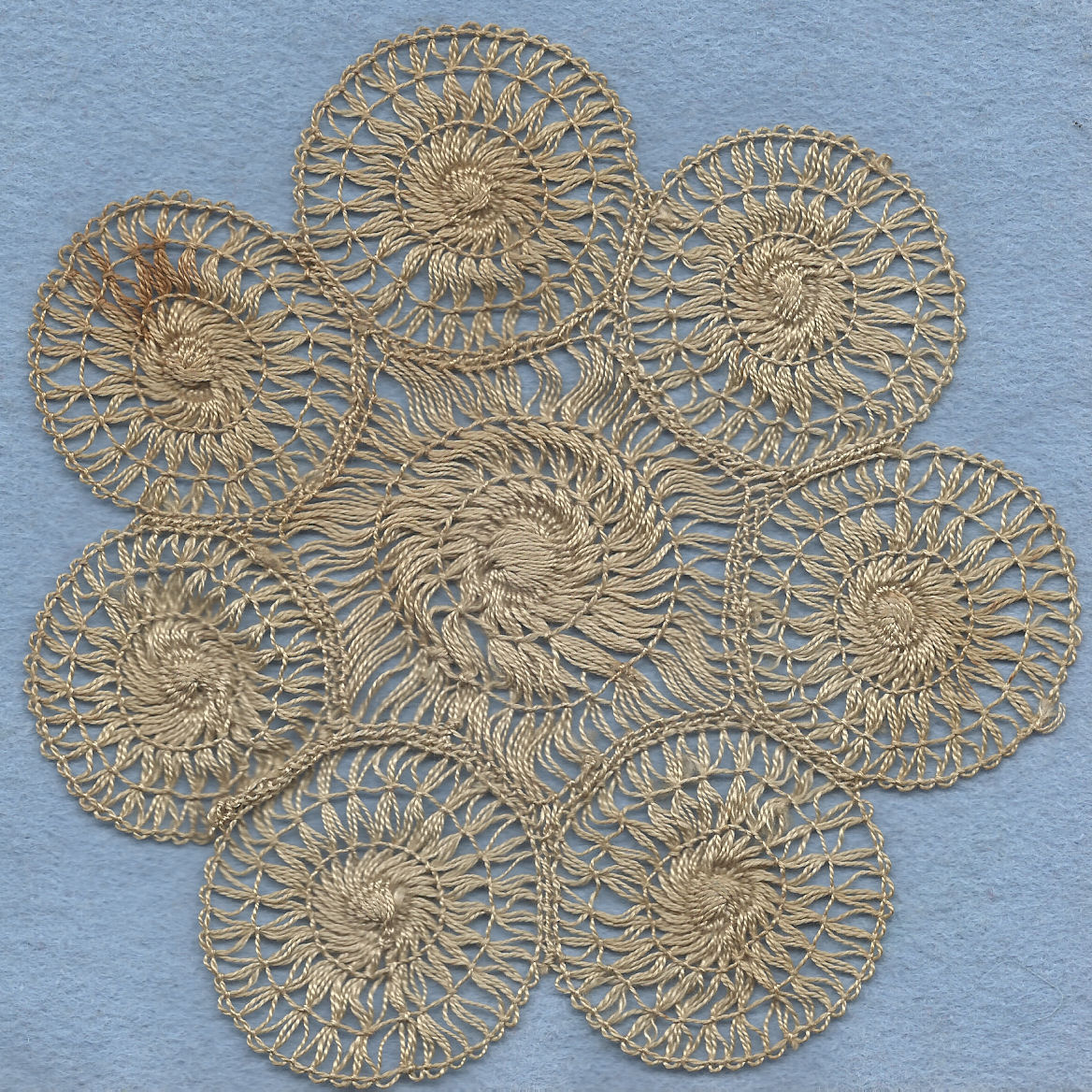
Tenerife lace
