= Maria Baldó i Massanet =

Spanish teacher, feminist, folklorist, liberal politician (1884–1964)

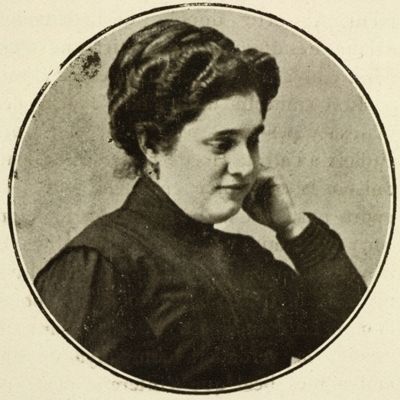
- (c. 1910)
- Born: 2 July 1884; Hellín, Albacete, Spain
- Died: 17 February 1964 (aged 79); Toulouse, France
- Occupations: pedagogue; ethnologist; folklorist
- Organization(s): General secretary, La Dona a la Reraguarda
- Political party: Republican Left of Catalonia
- Spouses: Josep Serra Chartó (d. 1911); Lluís Torres Ullastres
- Children: 1 son

Maria Baldó i Massanet (2 July 1884 - 17 February 1964) was a Spanish pedagogue, feminist, ethnologist, and folklorist. She was involved in the political, social, cultural, and educational fields of Catalonia.

== Biography ==
She was a daughter of Santiago Baldó i Domènech and Maria Mansanet (or Massanet) i Santacreu. She came to live in Catalonia as a child.

Trained as a folklorist, at the age of just over twenty, there is already evidence of various activities, such as the evening organized by the Escola d'Institutrius i Altres Carreres per a la Dona (School of Institutions and Other Careers for Women), in which she read her work Notas sobre las mujeres del Quixote (Notes on the women of the Quixote).

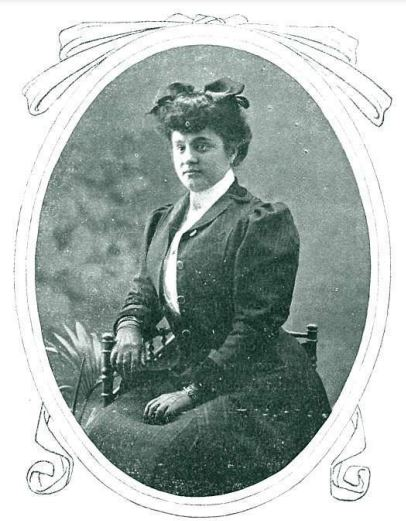
(1907)

From her first marriage with Josep Serra Chartó (died 1911), her son, Alfons Serra i Baldó, was born in 1909.

Baldo wrote for several periodicals, such as La Veu de Catalunya, Una védade, Art jove, Companya, Portantveu del Club Femení i d’esports de Barcelona, La Dona Catalana, and while in French exile, Tramontane.

She stood out among the women who shaped the first Catalan feminist movement at the beginning of the 20th century. In 1910, she taught a course on "Women's culture" at Ateneu Barcelonès, which she published in book form. On 28 April 1912 she published the article Sobre l'ensenyansa escolar femenina (About female school education) in the women's magazine Feminal. In 1933, she published El libro del hogar (The home book), which was republished on several occasions. In 1916, she took part in conferences on women's education, also at Ateneu, alongside other speakers such as Carmen Karr, Leonor Serrano, and Dolors Monserdà.

As a teacher, her career was closely linked to the La Farigola de Vallcarca school (currently, Escola La Farigola de Vallcarca). The school was established on 27 March 1922, the first female school of the Patronat Escolar de Barcelona (School Board of the Barcelona City Council). She herself assumed the direction as headmistress and collaborated closely with Manuel Ainaud i Sánchez to get state teachers to take the places of the other new municipal school groups. Likewise, she was part of the committee that selected the teachers. In those months, she assumed the role of Dean of Teachers in Barcelona. Baldó also acted as a free assistant teacher at the Escola Normal de Barcelona.

Baldo spoke at many conferences, also radio broadcasts. The most common themes were literature, children's games, and women's education. She called for the creation of specialized schools for the training of women and for the preparation for motherhood. During the 1930s, she was in charge of the Misiones Pedagógicas in Catalonia alongside Herminio Almendros. In 1933, she assumed the secretariat of the executive committee of the Social Education Congress. That same year, she became part of the executive committee of the Organizing Committee of the Left Women's Day. She also signed the Manifesto to the women of Catalonia, in July 1934, and, the following year, the intellectual Manifesto in favor of freedom, against fascism, and in favor of the creation of the Action Front for Defense of Culture. She assumed the presidency of the Lyceum Club of Barcelona in 1936, and the vice presidency of the executive committee of the Union of Women of Catalonia. She was part of the Second New Unified School Council. At the proposal of this body, she chaired the Adaptation Commission of the teaching staff of the Generalitat's technical bodies to the needs of the war. She was also general secretary of La Dona a la Reraguarda, section of the Propaganda Commissariat of the Generalitat de Catalunya.

Baldó was a supporter of Republicanism in Spain. She was a member of and an activist for the Republican Left of Catalonia. At the end of the Civil War, in 1939, Baldó went into exile in Toulouse, France, with her second husband, Lluís Torres Ullastres. In the old quarter, with other intellectuals and republican exiles such as Alexandre Galí i Coll, Jaume Serra i Húnter, Antoni Rovira i Virgili, and Pompeu Fabra, they quickly organized to continue the intellectual training of their children. Baldó, with the collaboration of her husband, directed the residence of exiled intellectuals in Toulouse, which depended directly on the Fundació Ramon Llull, although its management was highly questioned by various exiles such as the same Rovira i Virgili, Josep Maria Francès, and Ramon Vinyes.

== Death and legacy ==
Maria Baldó died in Toulouse, France, 1964.

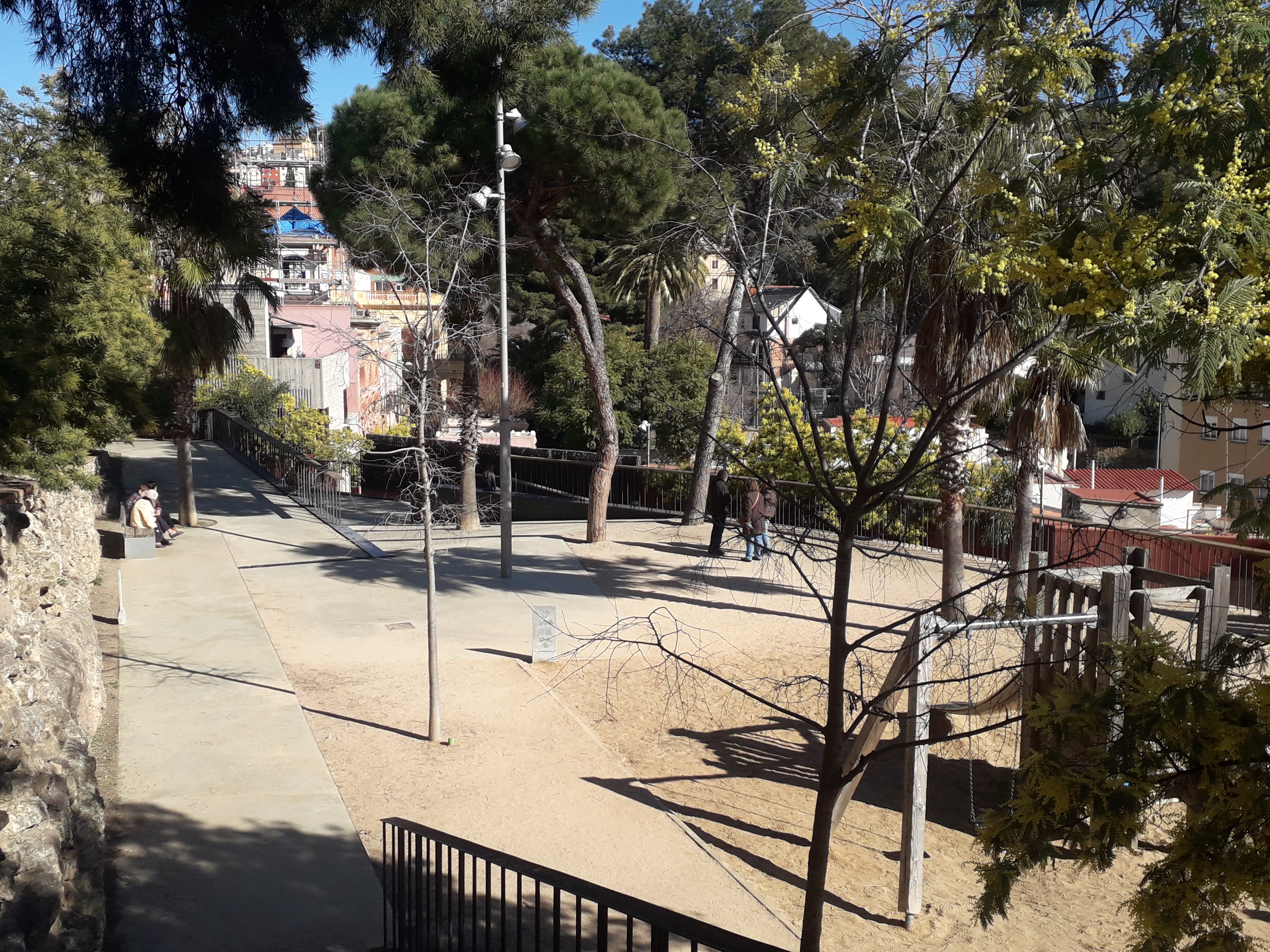
Jardins Maria Baldó

In the vicinity of La Farigola school, there are gardens that bear her name. Established in 1906, the Jardins de Maria Baldó occupy part of the gardens of the old Camils convent and have an area of nearly 2,500 square metres (27,000 sq ft).

== Selected works ==
- El libro del hogar, 1933
