= Tulle (netting) =

Lightweight and very fine netting

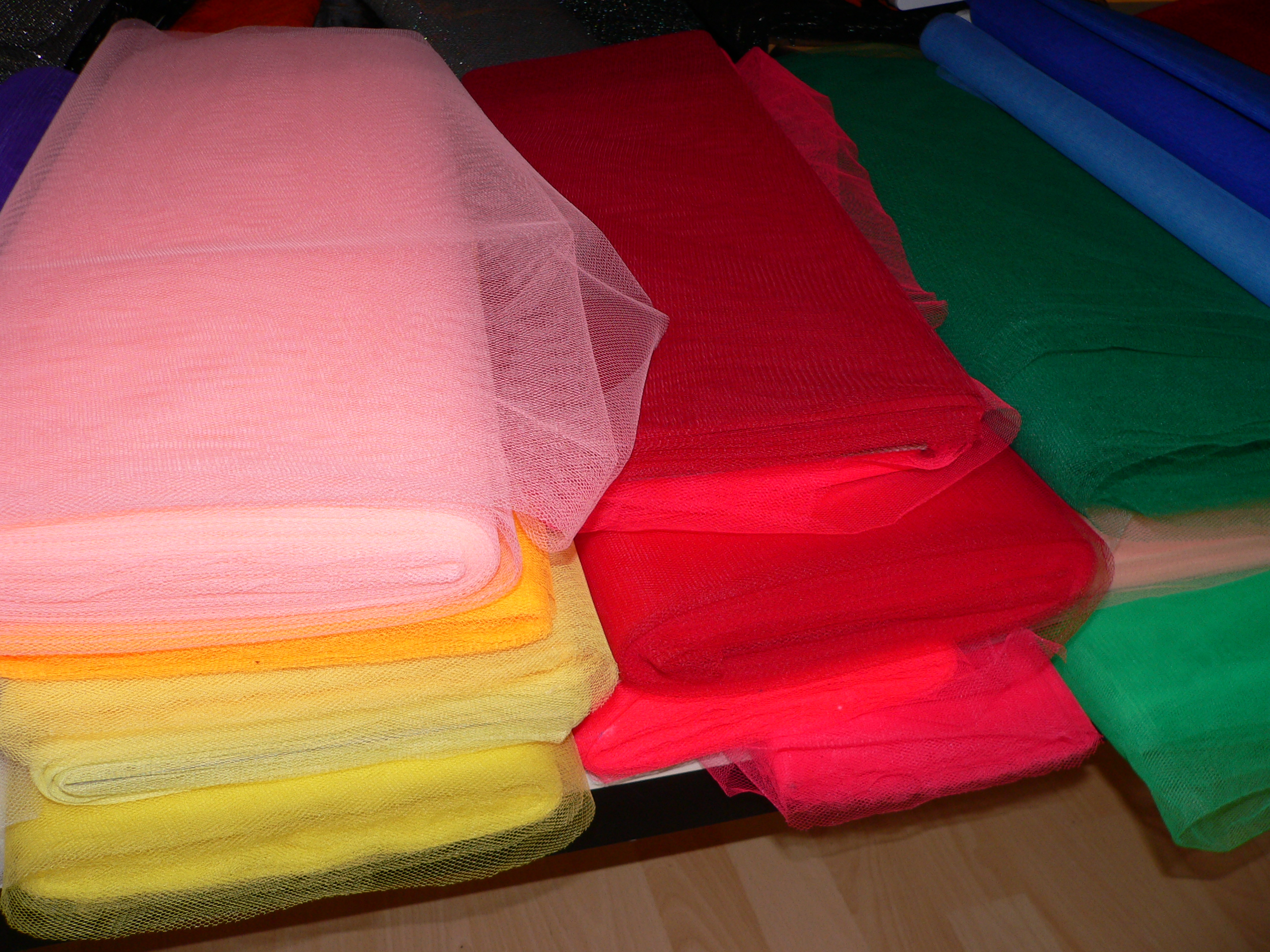
A stack of tulle fabrics in a variety of colors.

Tulle (/tjuːl/ TYOOL) is a form of netting that is made of small-gauge thread, netted in a hexagonal pattern with small openings, and frequently starched to provide body or stiffness. It is a finer textile than the textile referred to as "net".

== Makeup ==
It is a lightweight, very fine, stiff netting. It can be made of various fibres, including silk, nylon, polyester and rayon. Polyester is the most common fibre used for tulle. Rayon tulle is very rare. Tulle is most commonly used for veils, gowns (particularly wedding gowns), and ballet tutus. Tulle comes in a wide array of colors and can also be dyed at home using pigments appropriate for its composition.

== Name origin ==
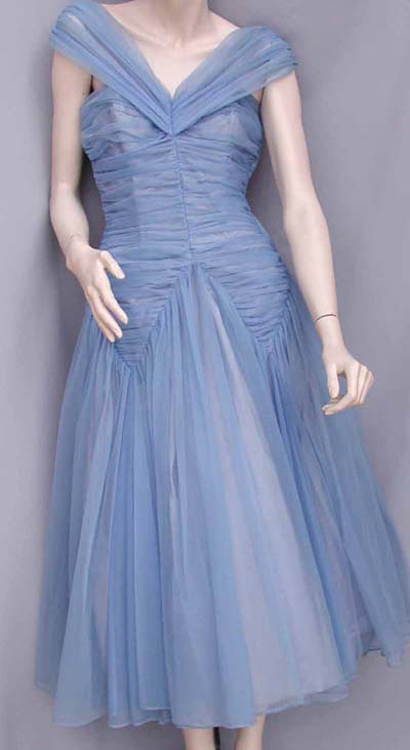
Tulle is often used to make gowns.

The name comes from Tulle, a small town in the southern central region of France. Tulle was well known as a centre of lace and silk production in the 18th century, and early tulle netting probably originated there. Tulle netting certainly appeared earlier in Parisian ballet costume than in most other nations, suggesting that tulle netting may have been more readily available there than elsewhere.

== Usages ==
One of the most common uses for tulle netting is in garments. Tulle is often used as an accent, to create a lacy, floating look. Tulle may also be used in underskirts or petticoats to create a stiff belled shape. Gowns are often puffed out with the use of several layers of stiff tulle. Tulle netting is also used to make veils, since it obscures the features of the face while allowing the wearer to see out.

Decorative ornaments can also be made from tulle netting. It is frequently used to wrap up gifts for weddings and baby showers. Scraps of tulle netting are sometimes used in quilting and crafts as well, to add texture to a project. Multicoloured tulle netting is often used for this purpose, to create tulle flowers and other ornamental accents.

== See also ==
- Organza, a woven sheer fabric
- Gossamer (fabric)
- Gauze
