= La Dona a la Reraguarda =

Dones antifeixistes. La dona a la reraguarda. US Espera. (1937)

La Dona a la Reraguarda (The woman in the rear) was a section of the Comissariat de Propaganda (Propaganda Commissariat) of the Generalitat de Catalunya, during the Spanish Civil War of 1936–39, which aimed to channel the help that women could provide to the combatants of the war.

Carme Ballester i Llasat, wife of president Lluís Companys was the honorary president; Anna Gil was part of its Board as president; and the general secretary was Maria Baldó i Massanet, who was close to the Republican Left of Catalonia. The organizations had delegations in several Catalan towns, such as Premià de Mar, Premià de Dalt, Arbúcies, and L'Hospitalet de Llobregat.[3] The organization with fairly autonomous in its work, which channeled aid to the combatants, both those at the front and those convalescing in the rear. In May 1937, it included 34,000 women. At the end of 1938, this section of the Propaganda Commissariat was reinforced by the Comissió Femenina d'Ajut al Combatent (Women's Commission of Aid to the Combatant), of the Commissariat itself. Its headquarters were at Carrer Còrsega 314, in Barcelona, and later at Avinguda Diagonal (then Avinguda 14 d'Abril), 389.
