= Cargo net =

Net used to secure or transfer cargo

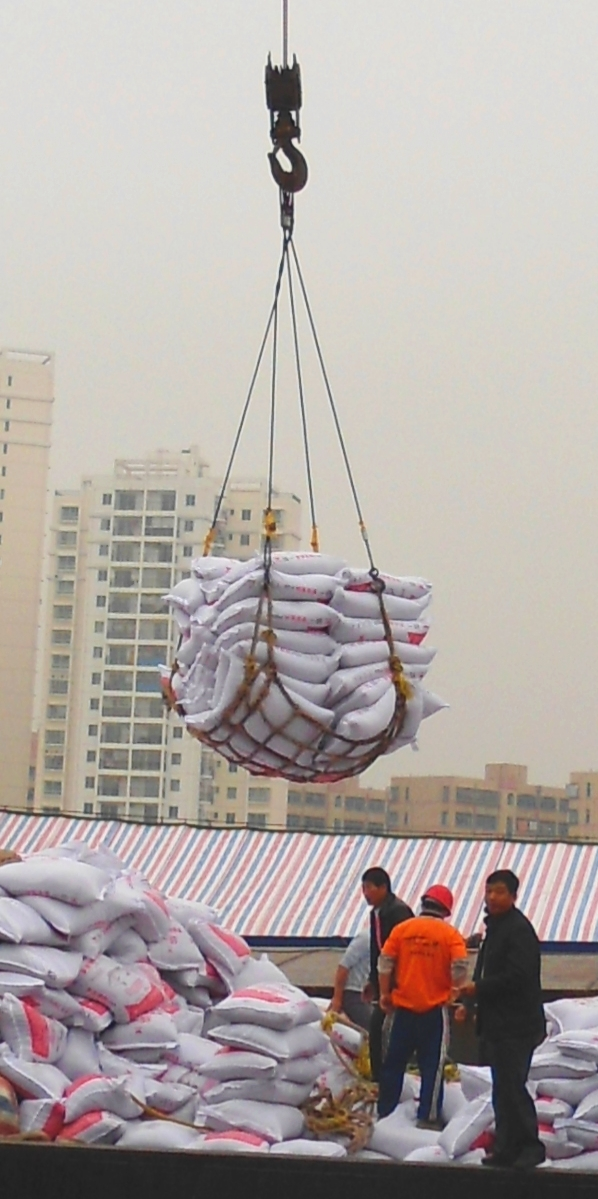
A cargo net being used to unload sacks from a ship at Haikou New Port, Haikou City, Hainan, China.

A cargo net is a type of net used for transferring cargo to and from ships. It is usually square or rectangular, but sometimes round, made of thick rope, with cinch ropes extending from the corners, and in some designs, the edges.

== Uses ==
=== Cargo transfer ===
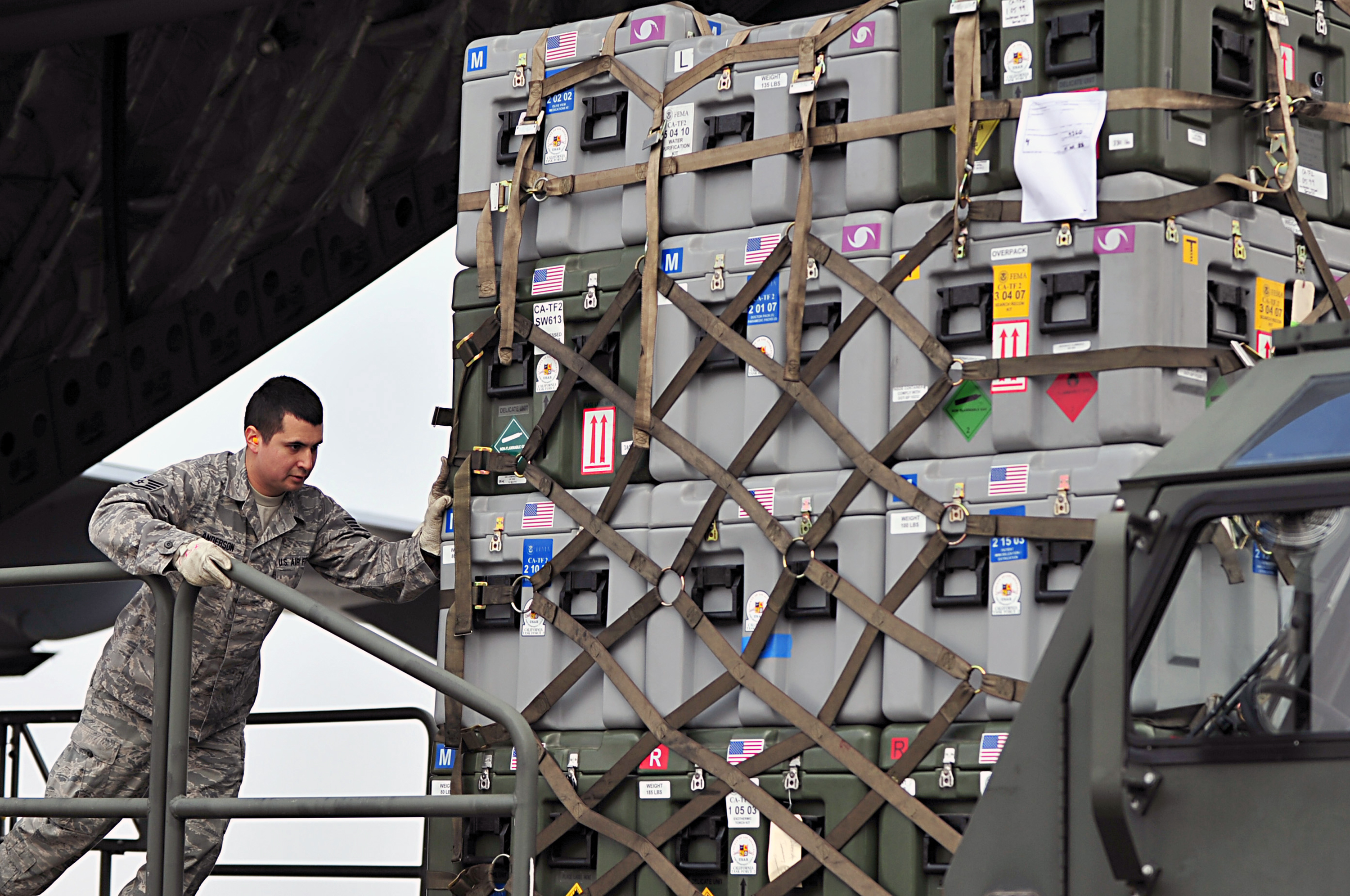
Loading cargo secured within a cargo net

In shipping, cargo lift nets are used to load and unload cargo. The net is spread out by stevedores, who load the goods onto it. They then attach the cinches to a crane hook. Lifting the hook draws the corners of the net around the cargo. This results in a balanced and secure load which can be safely hoisted. Goods are transferred from one place to another in the construction industry using cargo nets. When used to transfer cargo by helicopter, they are referred to as "underslung" cargo nets.

=== Securing loads ===
Cargo nets are used by the military, and in the shipping industry, to secure loads to prevent them from shifting during transport, as well as to deter theft.

=== Obstacle courses ===
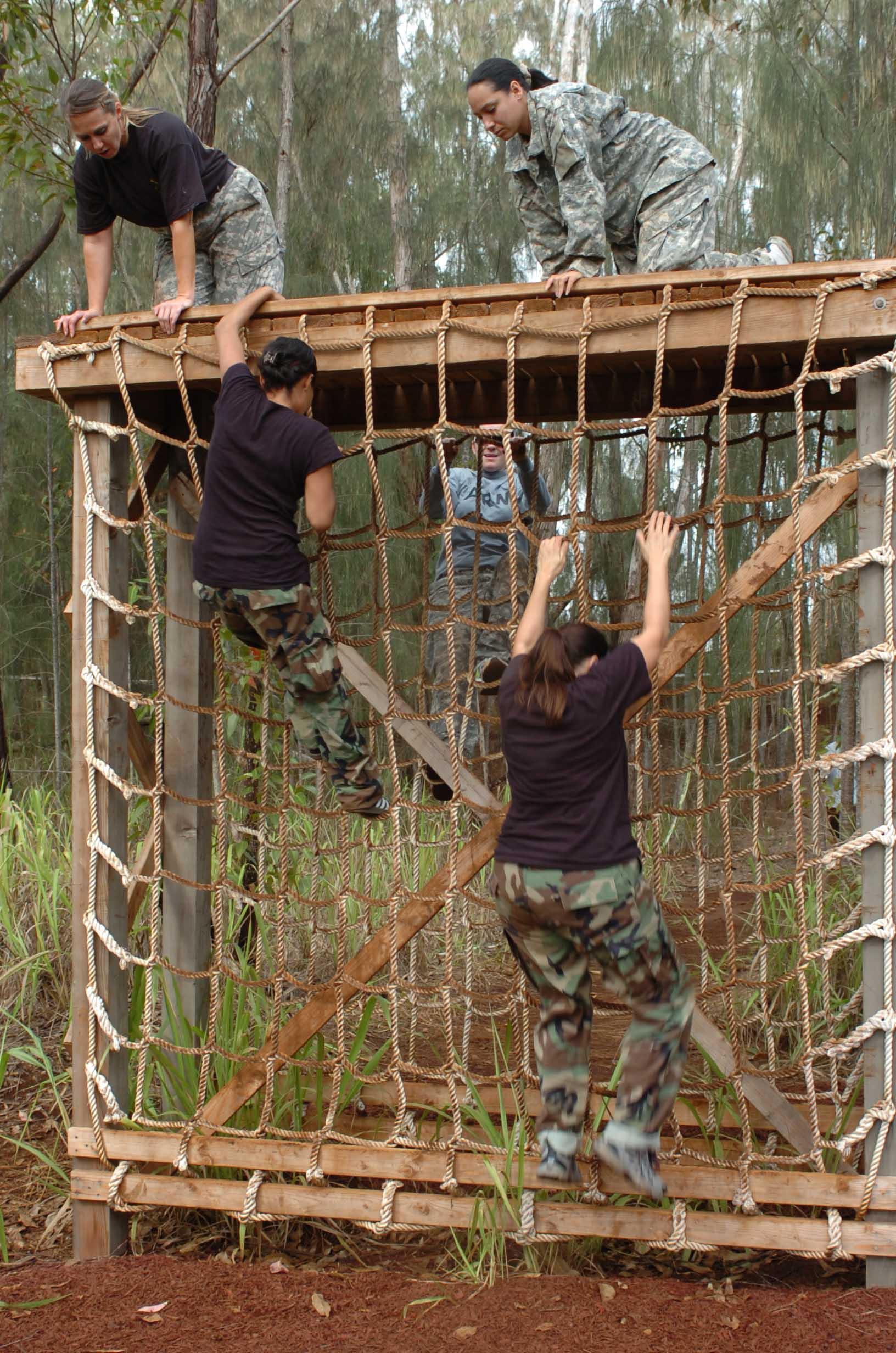
Climbing a cargo net

As part of obstacle courses, cargo nets are used as flexible ladders. This originated with landing nets used by amphibious assault troops to board landing craft in the water alongside the ship. The troops climbed down the nets hung over the ship's side and boarded the bobbing landing craft.

=== Playgrounds ===
Although still used in playgrounds around the world, cargo nets have been subject to criticism due to the hazard of strangulation. The U.S. Consumer Product Safety Commission has issued a notice expressing concern that a child's head can become trapped if the openings are of a particular size.

=== Marine rescue and ship embarkation ===
In maritime situations, cargo nets can be slung over the side of a ship to allow passengers stranded in the water to climb aboard to safety. Cargo nets can also be used to transfer troops from a ship to landing craft.

=== Safety barriers ===
Especially on ships, cargo nets are used as physical barriers, to prevent individuals from falling through openings or overboard into the sea.

== See also ==
- Material handling equipment
