= Buratto =

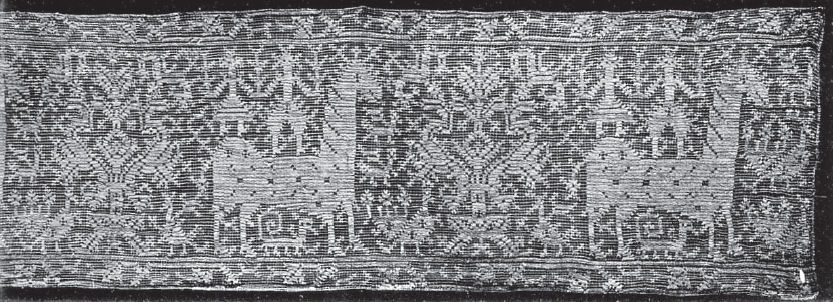
Buratto, 16th century Florence

Italy, 16th century - Chalice Veil with Monogram of Christ - 1920.1156 - Cleveland Museum of Art

Buratto is an Italian needle lace made by darning patterns onto a net. Buratto, meaning sieve or cheesecloth in Italian, refers to the net used. It is similar in appearance to filet lace however it is made using a woven net rather than a knotted net. Buratto also tends to be heavier in appearance due to the woven nature of the netting used

Grid patterns can be used to make buratto, each square representing a space in the net. Thread is woven into the net using a needle to make solid areas.

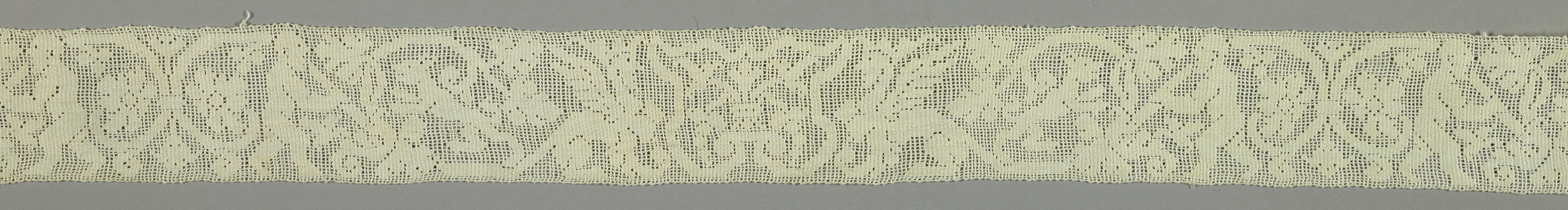
Band (Italy), 16th–17th century (CH 18457193)
