= Filet lace =

Embroidery on knotted net

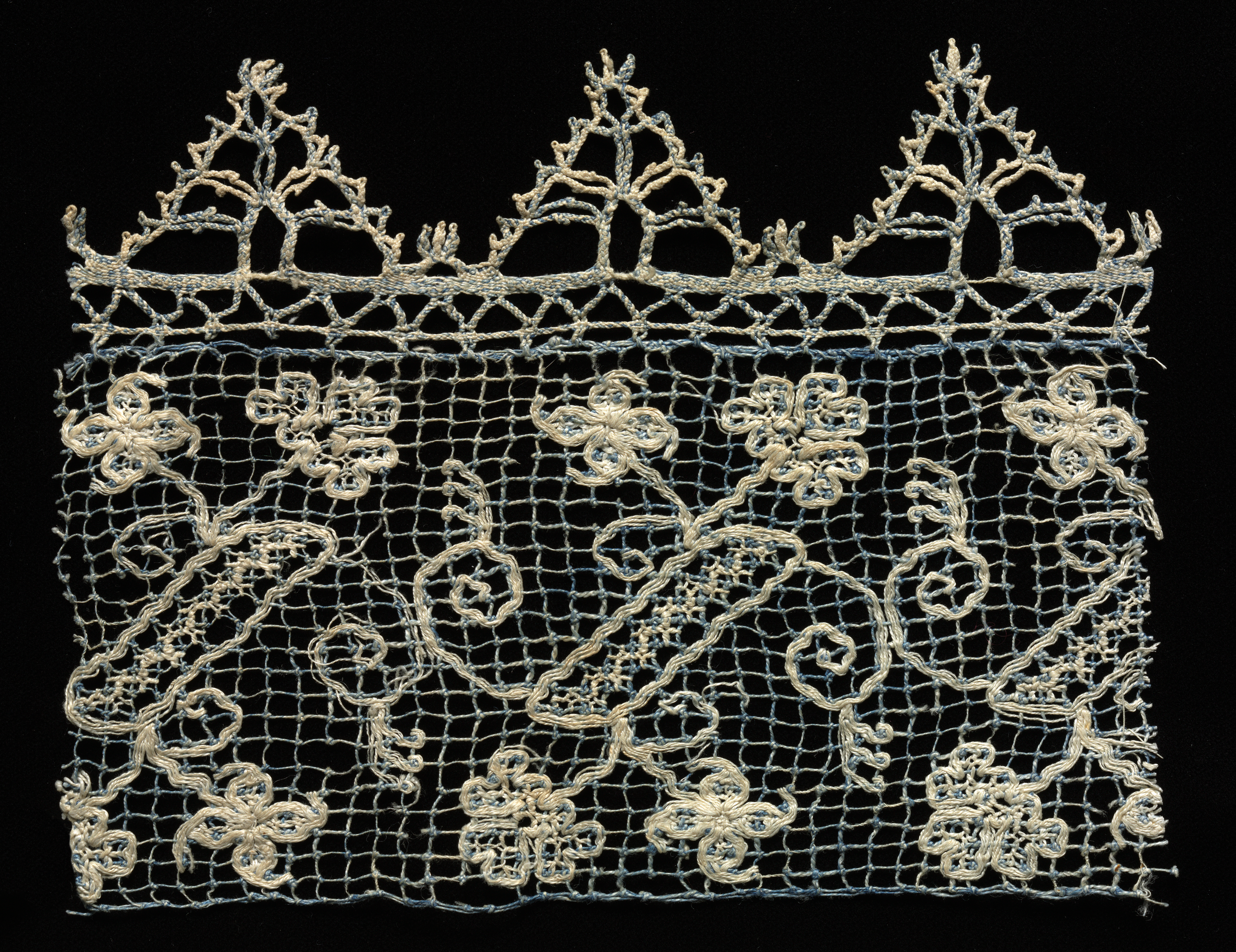
Italy, 17th century - Fragment of a Border with Vines and Floral Motifs - 1920.1129 - Cleveland Museum of Art

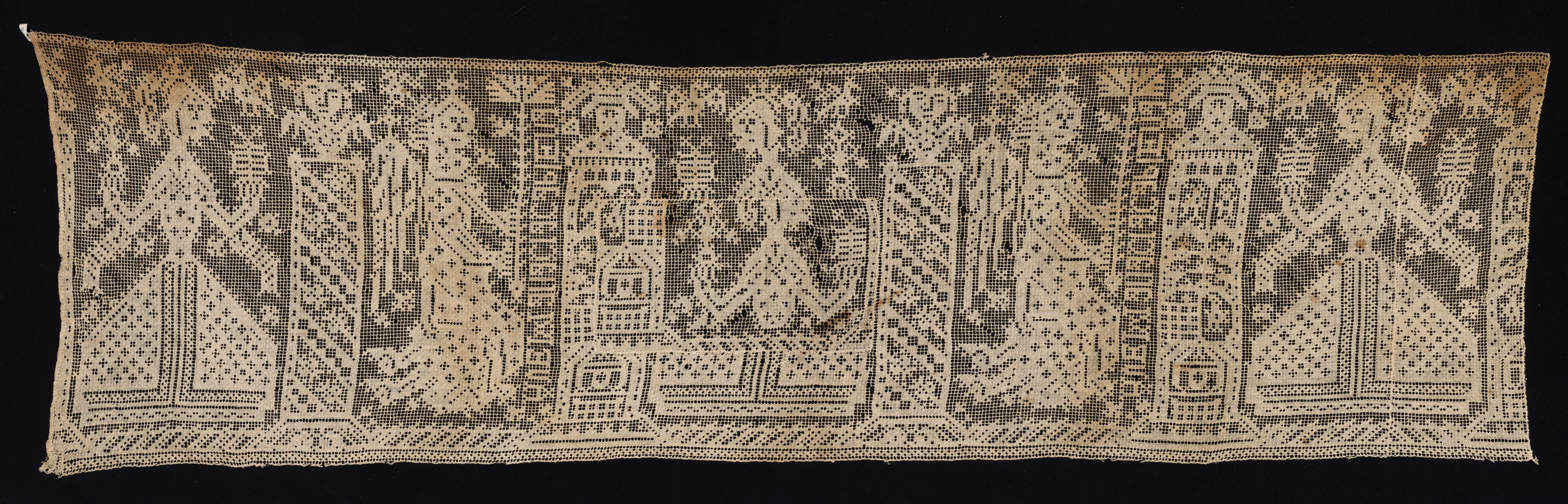
Italy, 16th-17th century - Band with Figures of Women and Angels - 1920.1272 - Cleveland Museum of Art

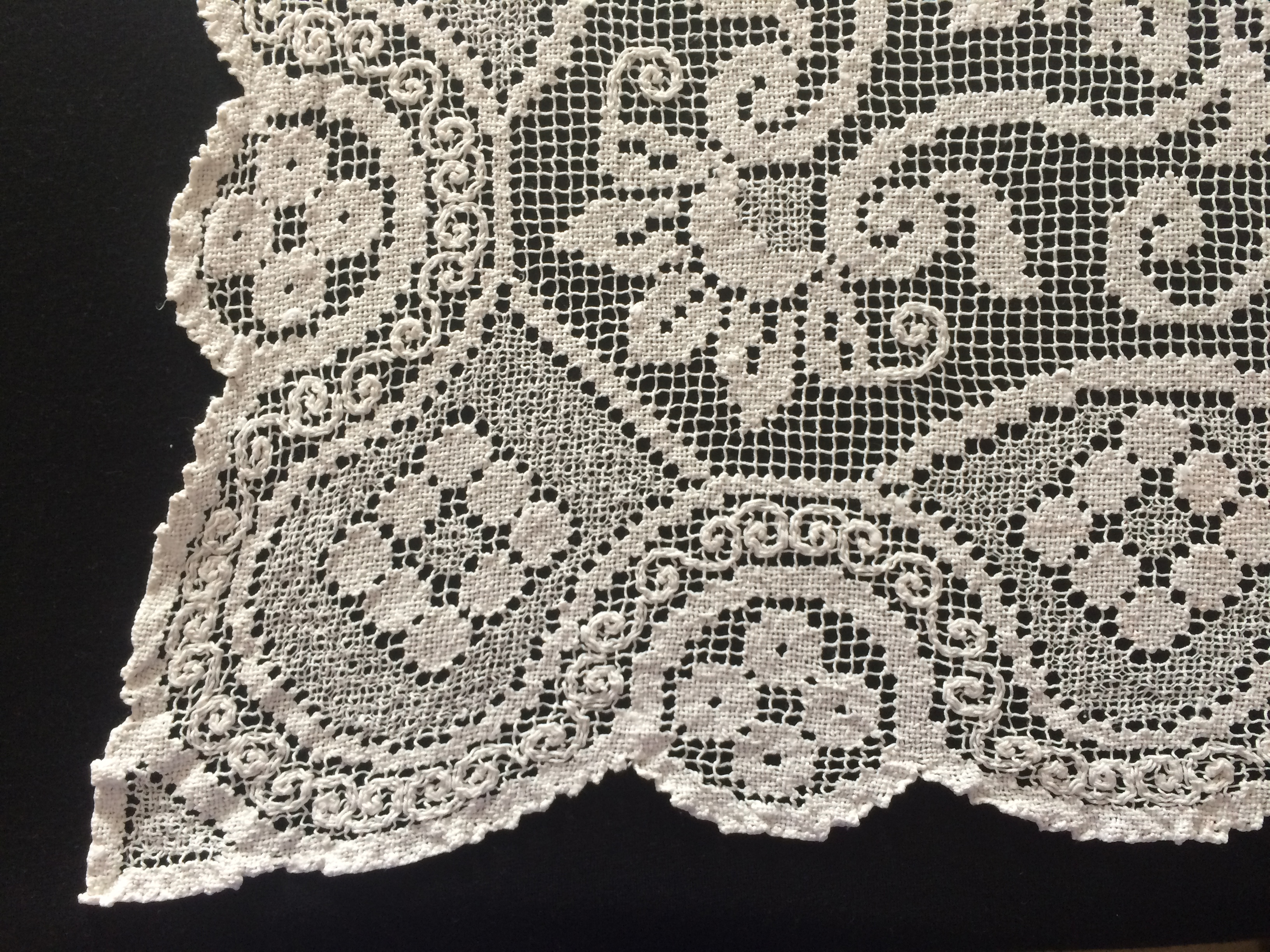
Filet lace Norway

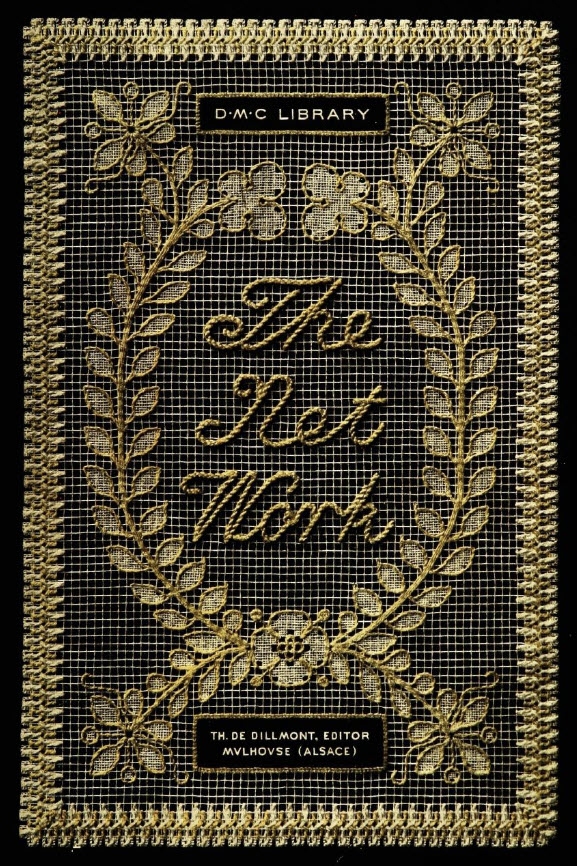
The cover of the book by Thérèse de Dillmont for DMC, about filet lace work, 1900

Filet lace is the general word used for all the different techniques of embroidery on knotted net (or in French broderie sur filet noué). It is a hand made needlework created by weaving or embroidery using a long blunt needle and a thread on a ground of knotted net lace or filet work made of square or diagonal meshes of the same sizes or of different sizes. Lacis uses the same technique but is made on a ground of leno (a woven fabric) or small canvas (not a knotted lace), and the style known as Buratto is similarly on woven and not knotted foundations.

== History ==
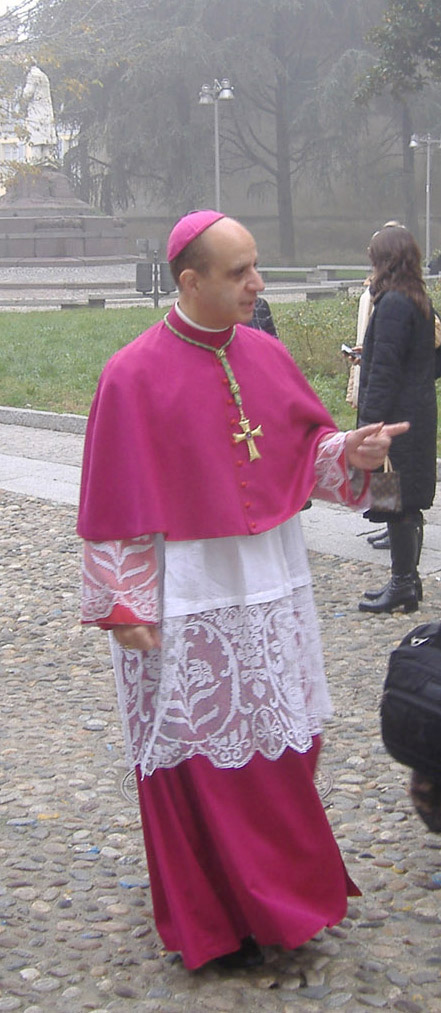
Monsignor wearing a rochet with filet lace

Filet lace is a form of decorative netting and as such can be presumed to have derived at some point from the fishnet that a community would require for fishing, hunting, transporting, etc. and not necessarily because they were living close to the water.

The Latin word filatorium is used to describe filet lace. Jourdain (1904) quotes a reference to Exeter Cathedral possessing four pieces of filet lace in 1327. The Latin word filatorium place for spinning, from filare ('to spin'), from Latin filum (thread - noun). (Note: See Latin filatory.) Ingram (1922) states that there was a "cushion of net-work in St. Paul's Cathedral so [sic] early as 1295." Such work, in the 14th century, was also described as "opus araneum".

Filet-work is the result of knotting a fabric of diagonal or square meshes to create an open fabric called lace. The tool to make a knotted net lace is a shuttle-needle and a gauge stick for measure of the meshes.

== Technique ==
Filet lace (linen stitch) being worked.

As mentioned above, filet lace is often created by doing embroidery stitches on a knotted net lace. The knotted ground lace can either be made by the lacemaker or purchased commercially in either handmade or machine-made varieties.

Making the net by hand with a shuttle needle and a gauge involves anchoring the piece, using either a heavy cushion, (Note: Carità (1909) recommends the cushion be made of lead; however, this should be replaced by sand or a C clip.) a chair, or a stirrup around the worker's foot. Having a secure anchor against which to maintain tension, a square net is made starting from one corner and adding a new mesh on each row until the desired size is reached, then by decreasing. The individual meshes are formed on a gauge which helps ensure a uniform size and are created by knotting to a loop in the previous round: square mesh, diagonal mesh, circular, free form. By using a very fine thread and different sizes of gauge one can create complex and delicate lace work.

The knotted lace is then stretched on a frame and embroidery stitches are added using a long blunt needle and a thread. Patterns are designed on a grid with a mark for the meshes to be filled with the thread. A path (or direction) is traced on this pattern and then you follow this path with the needle on the ground lace.

When a group of certain stitches are used, the technique takes a name; examples of this include filet Guipure, filet Richelieu, filet Soutache, linen stitch (point de toile), and darning stitch (point de reprise). There are also regional variants, such as filet di Bosa, filet Italien, filet de Gruyère, and Russian filet Guipure.

Many designs involve weaving the main design in linen stitch, indeed some designs consist entirely of linen stitch. This creates solid and open areas on the piece. A geometrical design or a sampler can use several different stitches, when a figural design will use very few stitches or only the linen stitch.

Filet lace is often seen in a single color of thread, usually white or ecru, but countries all over the world have used colored thread, precious metal threads, wool, feathers, and other materials.
