= Net (textile) =

Textile in which the warp and weft yarns are looped or knotted at their intersections

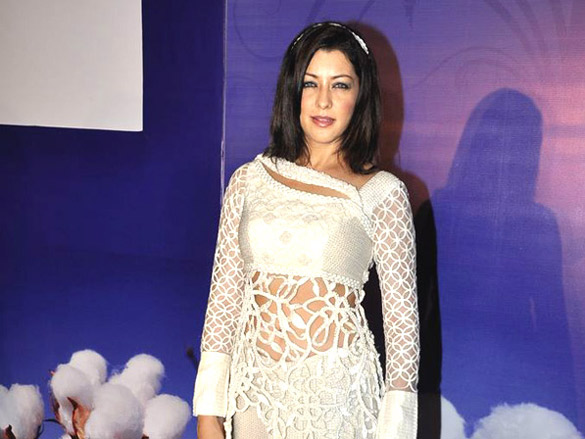
Dress made of netting.

Net or netting is any textile in which the yarns are fused, looped or knotted at their intersections, resulting in a fabric with open spaces between the yarns. Net has many uses, and comes in different varieties. Depending on the type of yarn or filament that is used to make up the textile, its characteristics can vary from durable to not durable.

== Uses ==
People use net for many different purposes.

=== Fishing ===
Netting is one of the key components to fishing in mass quantities. This textile is used because of its sturdy yet flexible origin, which can carry weight yet, still be lightweight and compactable. Fishermen use netting when trawling, because it is sturdy enough to carry large amounts of weight as fish are trapped, pulled, then lifted out of water. Oftentimes, the filaments that make up the yarn are coated with wax or plastic. This coating adds a waterproof component to the textile that provides even more reliability.

=== Fashion ===
Netting has been used in fashion for centuries. Tulle is a form of netting that is made of small-gauge thread, netted in a hexagonal pattern with small openings, and frequently starched to provide body or stiffness. It is typically used for veils. In the West, a white tulle veil is commonly worn over the head and face, with a bridal gown. Tulle is also used to form the skirt of the traditional ballet tutu, to provide body and volume, without adding significant weight.

=== Medicine ===
Net is also used in medical practices to provide fabric insulation and wrapping under an industry standard sling. In the medical practice, netting provides cushion and protection, when used in layers, but still allows the skin to breathe under the fabric. Depending on what the netting is being used for, a different wax or plastic coating can be applied in order to cover the filaments that make up the yarn. Filaments can be made from synthetic or natural fibres, depending on the end use of the fabric itself.

=== Other uses ===
Net is commonly used in camping tents. Air can easily pass through the holes, which allows breathability that does not trap bacteria, and remains impermeable to pests and insects. Netting is often used for luggage bags to create transparent, breathable compartments that allow people to store items. Netting has many similar components to mesh, as they both allow air to pass through easily, and share a lot of the same uses. Bigger woven knits have varying different uses, and smaller, tighter woven knits are varied as well.

A related function of netting is as a means to allow airflow while excluding mosquitoes and other airborne vermin.

== Types ==
=== Hand-made netting ===
Hand-made or machine-made net is used as the foundation fabric for many kinds of needlework, including Filet lace and tambour lace. Netting can be used for many things. This includes adding fullness to a dress, most commonly wedding and prom dresses. It is also used for many costumes, including fairy outfits. Netting can also be used to make tutus for dancing costumes. Netting can also be referred to when considering the handmade craft. Using either the lace-maker or the net-maker method to tie the netting knot, several types of netting can be created. Diamond mesh netting goes back and forth, in rows. This technique is used for bags, hammocks, headbands and scarves. Another type is square mesh netting which also goes back and forth in rows but is worked in the diagonal. This type of net is used for trawling. The first row starts at one corner and the last row finishes the corner diagonal to the first corner. This is often used as a foundation for lacis or net embroidery. Spiral netting is a type of netting that goes around and around in a similar manner to knitting or crochet. There is no beginning or ending to specific rounds, as the pattern is continuous.

=== Knotless netting ===
Different weaving patterns can be used for different kinds of netting. Depending on the use of the textile, the size of the holes in the net will vary. Weaving patterns, opposed to knitting patterns, are more often used for knotless netting. Jason Mills states that, as there are no knots used to produce this kind of netting, it is usually less sturdy and movable. Each strand, when used for a knotless netting weave, can sometimes be coated before being woven to ensure more durability. If a weave is coated after being woven it can show to be more durable when exposed to heat or pressure- depending on the type of coat.

== See also ==
- Bobbinet
- Mosquito net
- Needlerun net
