= Fishing Museum, Palamós =

Museum in Palamós, Spain

Coordinates: 41°50′42″N 3°07′36″E

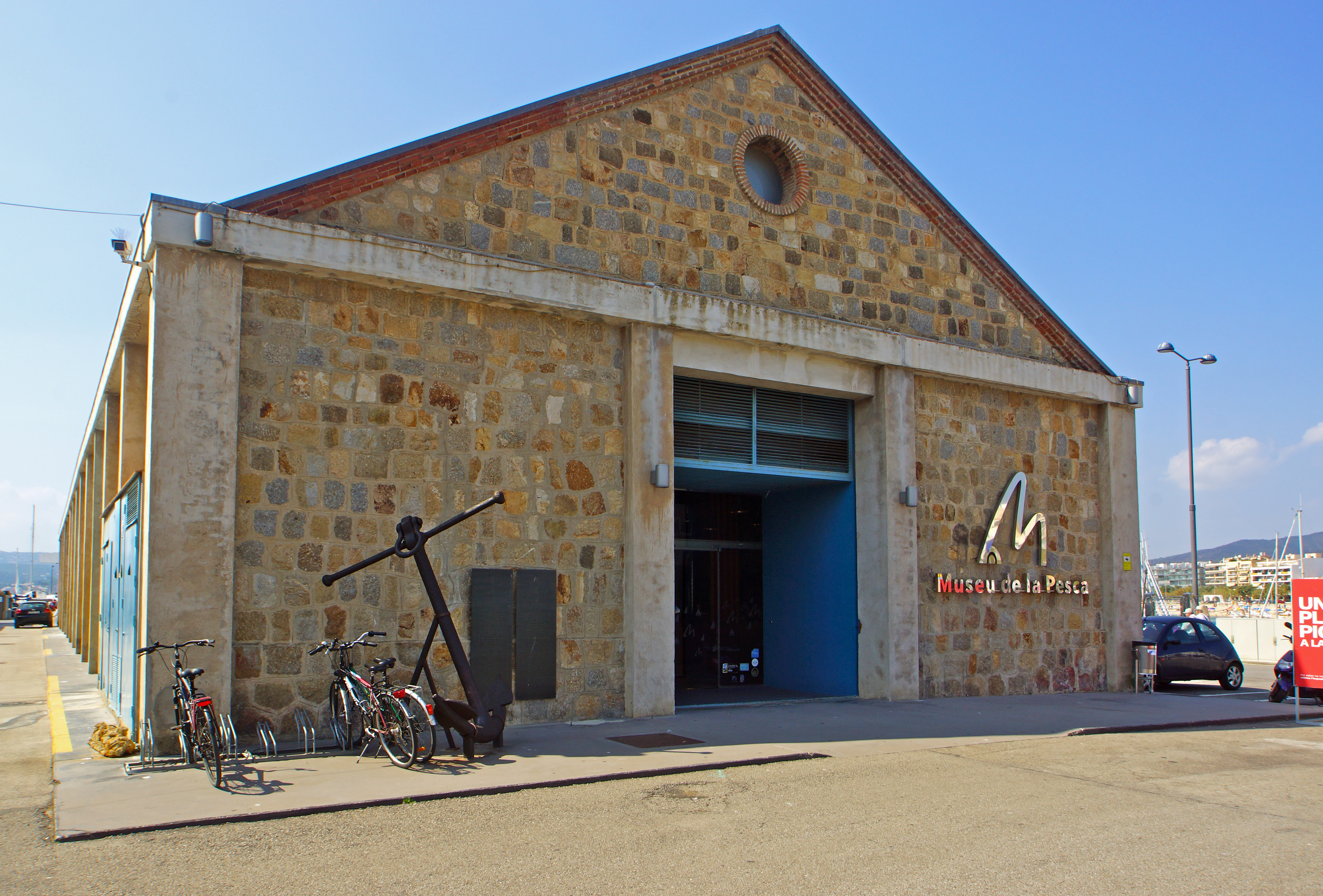
The Fishing Museum in Palamós

Opened in 2002, the Fishing Museum is dedicated to fishing knowledge and dissemination, and Costa Brava's maritime heritage. Located in the Palamós fishing port in an old warehouse called "Tinglado", the permanent exhibition explains the history, current affairs and sustainable fishing in Costa Brava's future.

The Fundació Promediterrània manages the Fishing Museum, a municipal facility.

== Origin ==
The Fishing Museum began in 1920 with founding the Cau de la Costa Brava in order to set up a new museum. In 1994, the Palamós City Council signed an agreement with the University of Girona to create a field of study and investigation to create the museum project. This collaboration redefined the project to turn it into a thematic museum dedicated to fishing in the Costa Brava. In 1999, the project for the Inventory of Maritime and Fishing Heritage of the Costa Brava began, as part of the Ethnological Heritage Inventory of Catalonia. Another project development aim was to change the headquarters to one located in the fishing port, much more linked to the theme. In 1999 Ports of the Generalitat de Catalunya ceded the 'Tinglado' building, which now houses the Fishing Museum.

Currently, the Fishing Museum is part of the Costa Brava Museums Network, the Network of Museums of Ethnology, the Network of Maritime Museums of the Catalan Coast, the Territorial Network of Museums of the Counties of Girona, the ICOM (International Council of Museums), the ICMM (International Council of Maritime Museums) and the AMMM (Association of Mediterranean Maritime Museums).

== Mission and goals ==
The Fishing Museum's mission is to contribute as a quality element "to the cultural, economic and social development of the community. It works to strengthen its own territory and help" reflect on and contribute to how marine and fishing heritage favor society.

The Museum seeks to guarantee the conservation, protection and safeguarding of the Museum collections to promote maritime and fishery research and raise sustainability awareness.

In this way, the Fishing Museum shows the historical and elemental relationships between Man and the sea in an open, participatory and interpretative format. Visitors will feel part of a story that centers on fish and fishing, one which will leave them with a new way of viewing this ancient, seafaring trade. The museum, a place of dialogue between fishermen and society, aims to recover and preserve the ideas of this ancient tradition, while helping visitors discover an exciting, yet fragile world.

== The exhibition ==
The Fishing Museum permanent exhibition is in the Tinglado building, a 1930s port warehouse. The museum project was commissioned by the architects Dani Freixes, Eulàlia González and Artur Arias, and won the 2001 National Design Award.

=== Awards ===
- Sea Heritage Best Communication Campaign 2012
- Tourist Quality in Destinations - SICTED 2010
- European Museum Forum of the Year Award 2005

== Services and facilities ==
The Fishing Museum has different services and facilities to achieve its mission and goals.

=== Espai del Peix (Gastronomic place) ===
The "Espai del Peix" is a cultural equipment located on the fish market at Palamós port that works as a gastronomic place. It contributes to the knowledge and sustainability of fishery products and their gastronomy, claiming and educating those unlisted species, but with a high culinary and gastronomic value.

=== Les Barques del Peix (The fish' boats) ===
Floating extension of the Fishing Museum itself, consisting of the boats 'Gacela', the old fishing boat of dragging, and the "Polar Star", dedicated to fishing encircling.

=== Càtedra d'Estudis Marítims (Maritime Studies Chair) ===
It's part of the University of Girona in the territory and its objective is to become a platform for study, external projection and dissemination of the marine and fishing activity of the Girona coastline.

=== DOCUMARE ===
Information and documentation service specialized in maritime and fishing issues. It adds and disseminates information and documentation with added value in order to promote research, knowledge, value and raise awareness of society towards activity, culture and maritime heritage.

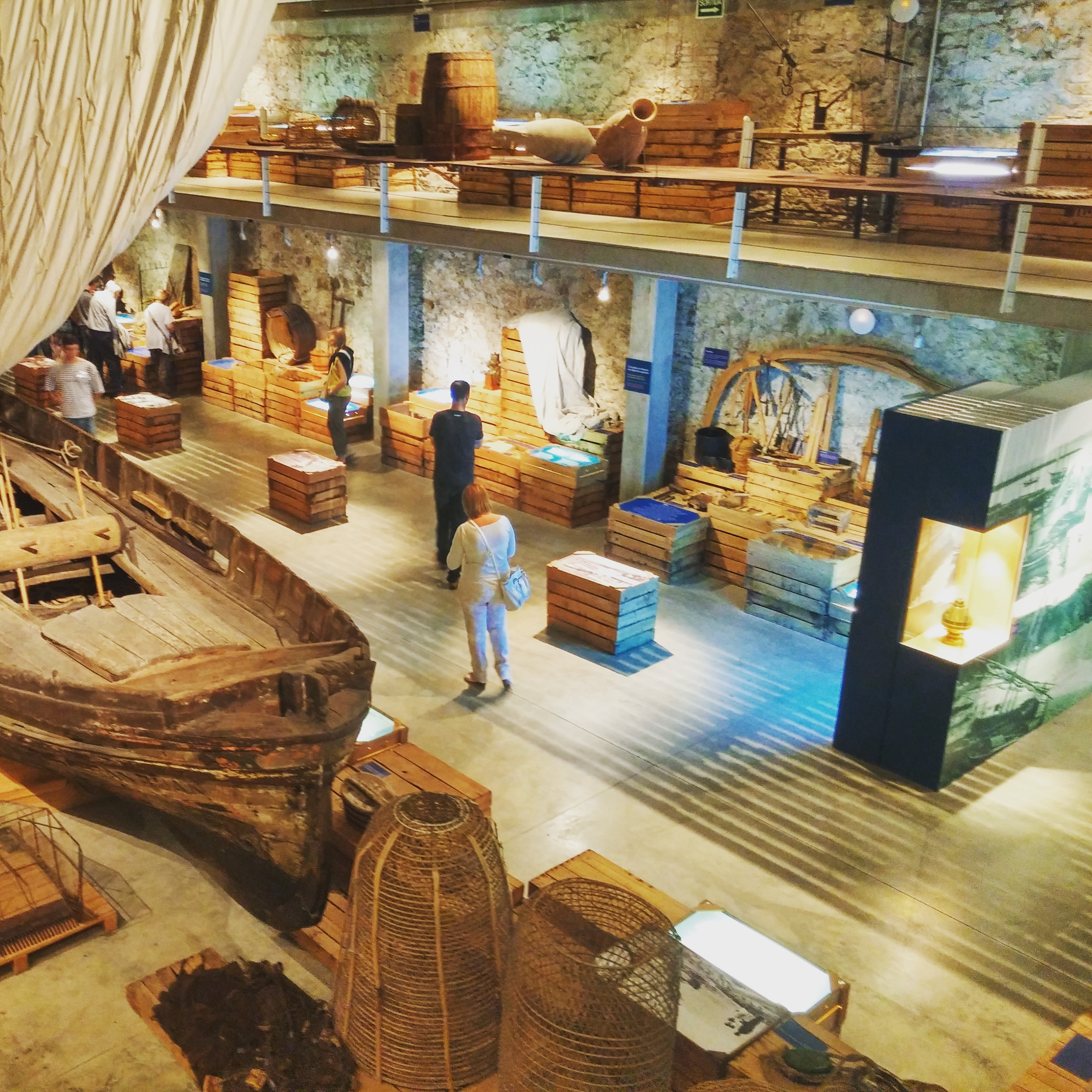
The permanent exhibition

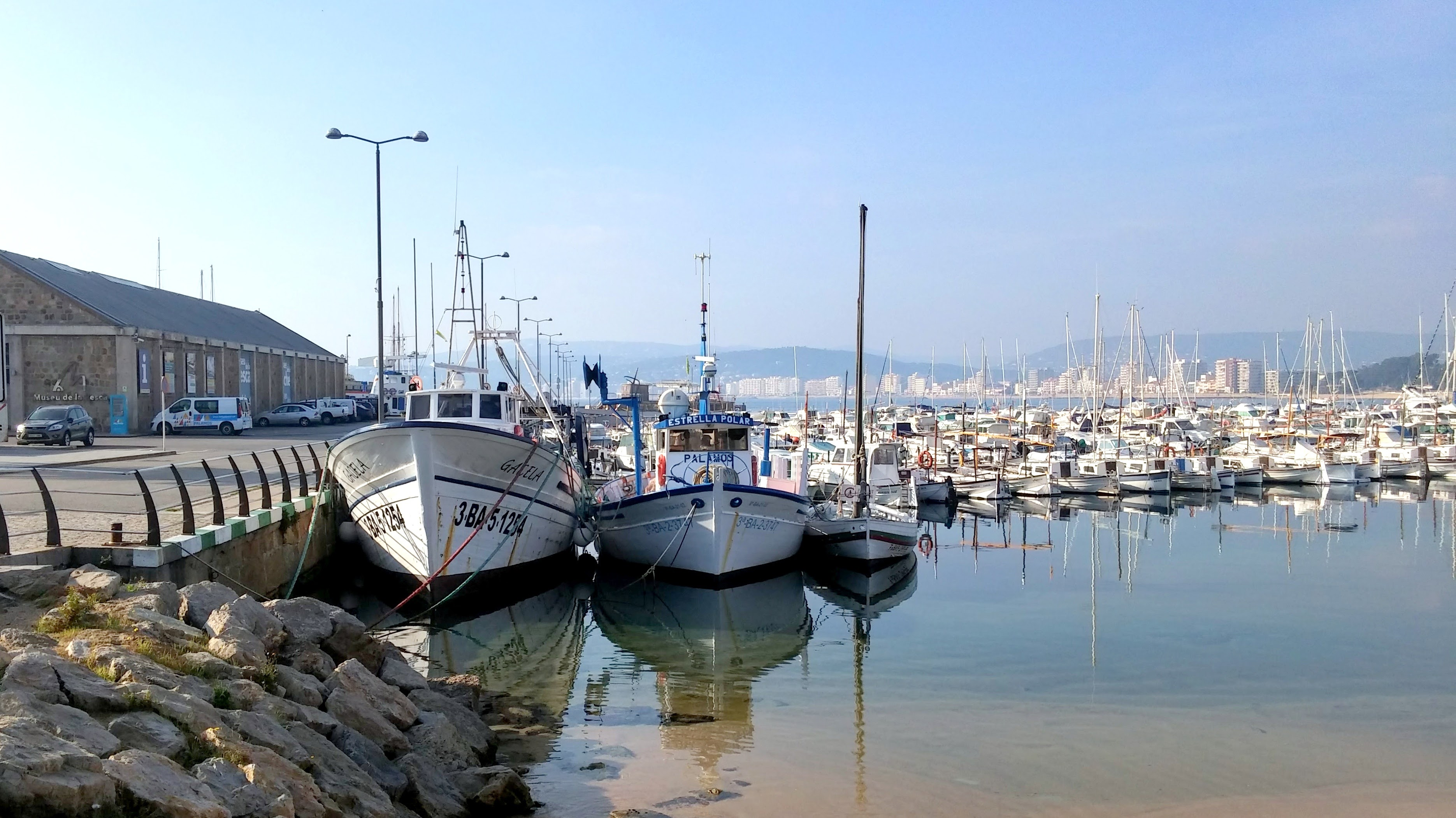
The fish' boat
