= Needlerun net =

Lace fabric

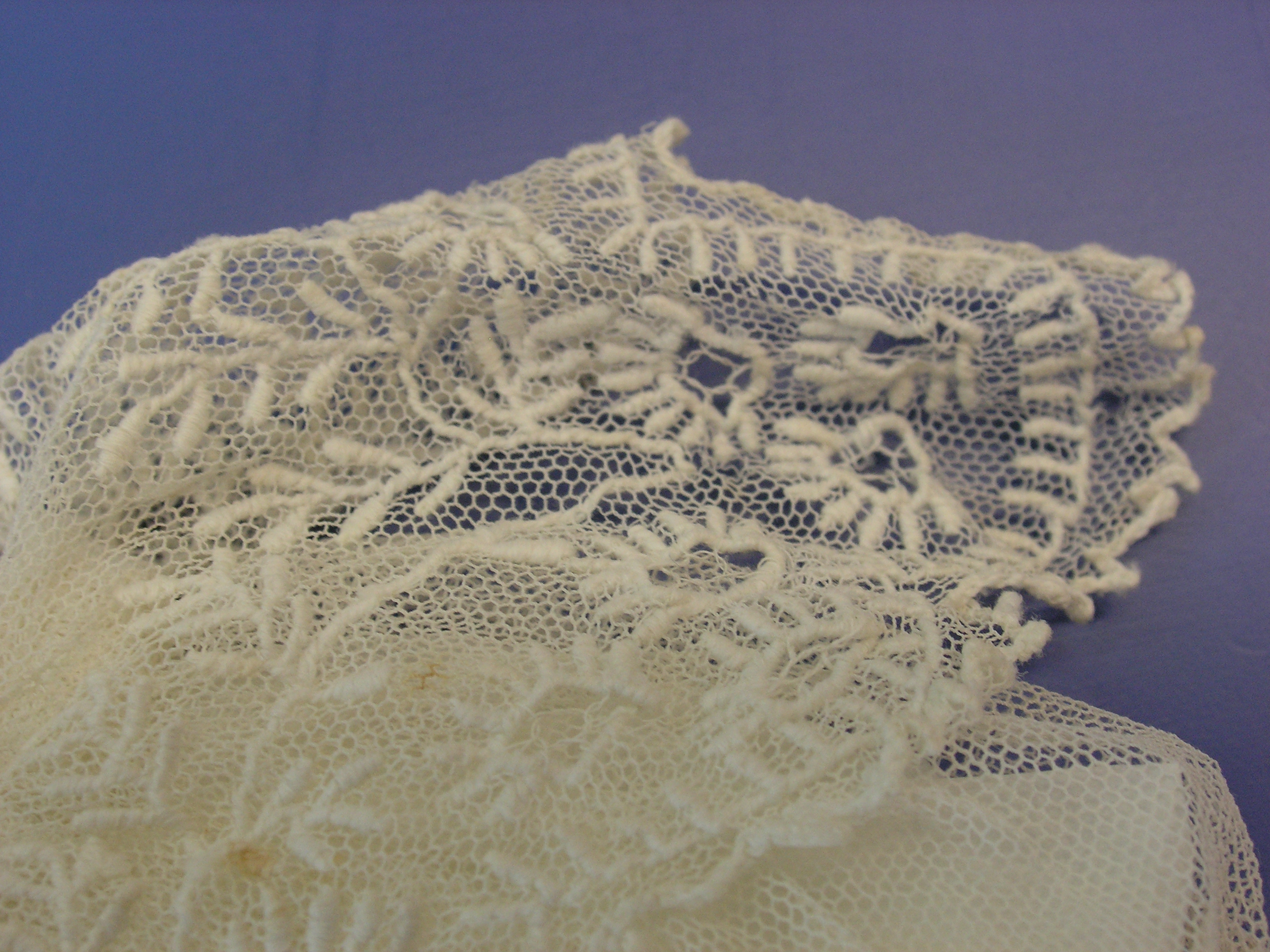
Detail of an infant's bodice in Limerick lace

Needlerun net is a family of laces created by using a needle to embroider on a net ground.

Along with Tambour lace this became more popular with the advent of machine made netting.

It is used in Limerick lace.
