= Art jove =

Catalan magazine (1905-1906)

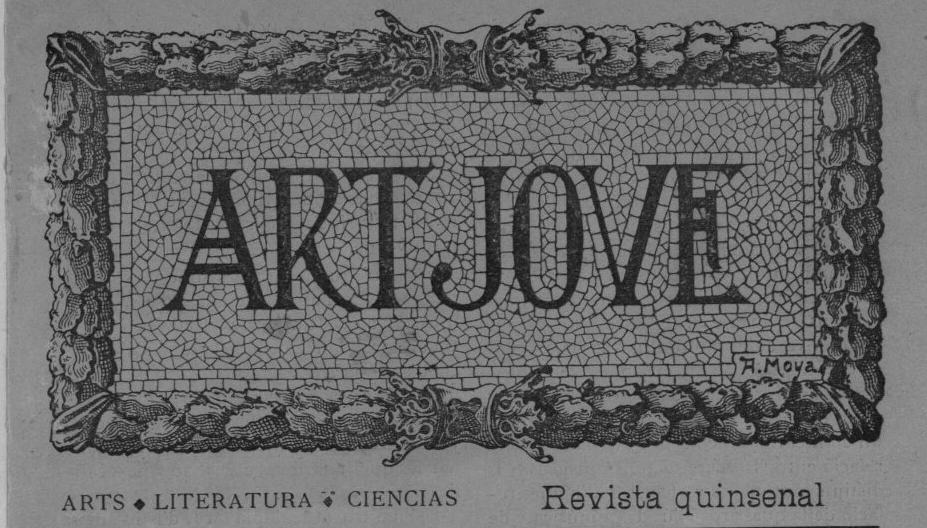
Front cover of the magazine "Art Jove"

Art jove was a Catalan magazine, first published on 15 December 1905. The magazine was directed by Sebastià Xanxó and was published every fortnight. It was printed in the printing house “La Catalana” which was in Balmes Street, Barcelona. Regarding its format, it had a measurement of 221x140mm, and it cost 15 cents of peseta. It disappeared on 31 October 1906 with a total of 22 issues.

== Theme and collaborators ==
The magazine was dedicated to arts, sciences and literature. In the first page, the writers said that the intention of “Art jove” was to contribute to the rebirth of the Catalan language. The magazine published writings in prose and verse, which were almost all of them written by young writers.

The collaborators of the magazine were Gabriel Alomar, Artur Masriera, Emili Vallès, Miquel R. Ferrà, J. Oliva Bridgmann, Pere Prat Gaballí, among others. The most important illustrator was I. Smith. The headline was designed by A. Moya.
