= 1550–1600 in European fashion =

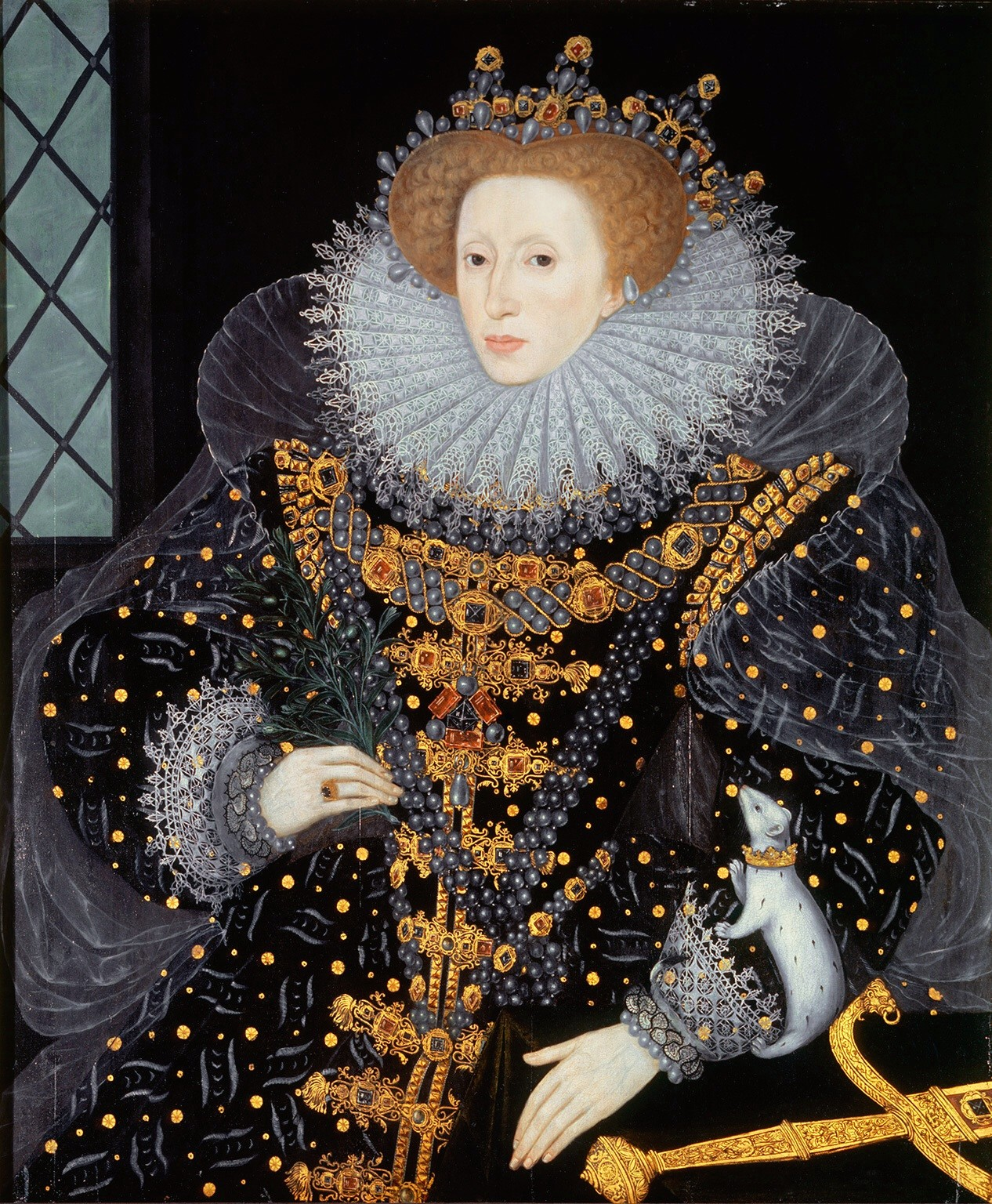
English opulence, Italian reticella lace ruff, (possibly) Polish ornamentation, a French farthingale, and Spanish severity: The "Ermine Portrait" of Elizabeth I

Fashion in the period 1550-1600 in European clothing was characterized by increased opulence. Contrasting fabrics, slashes, embroidery, applied trims, and other forms of surface ornamentation remained prominent. The wide silhouette, conical for women with breadth at the hips and broadly square for men with width at the shoulders had reached its peak in the 1530s, and by mid-century a tall, narrow line with a V-lined waist was back in fashion. Sleeves and women's skirts then began to widen again, with emphasis at the shoulder that would continue into the next century. The characteristic garment of the period was the ruff, which began as a modest ruffle attached to the neckband of a shirt or smock and grew into a separate garment of fine linen, trimmed with lace, cutwork or embroidery, and shaped into crisp, precise folds with starch and heated irons.

== General trends ==
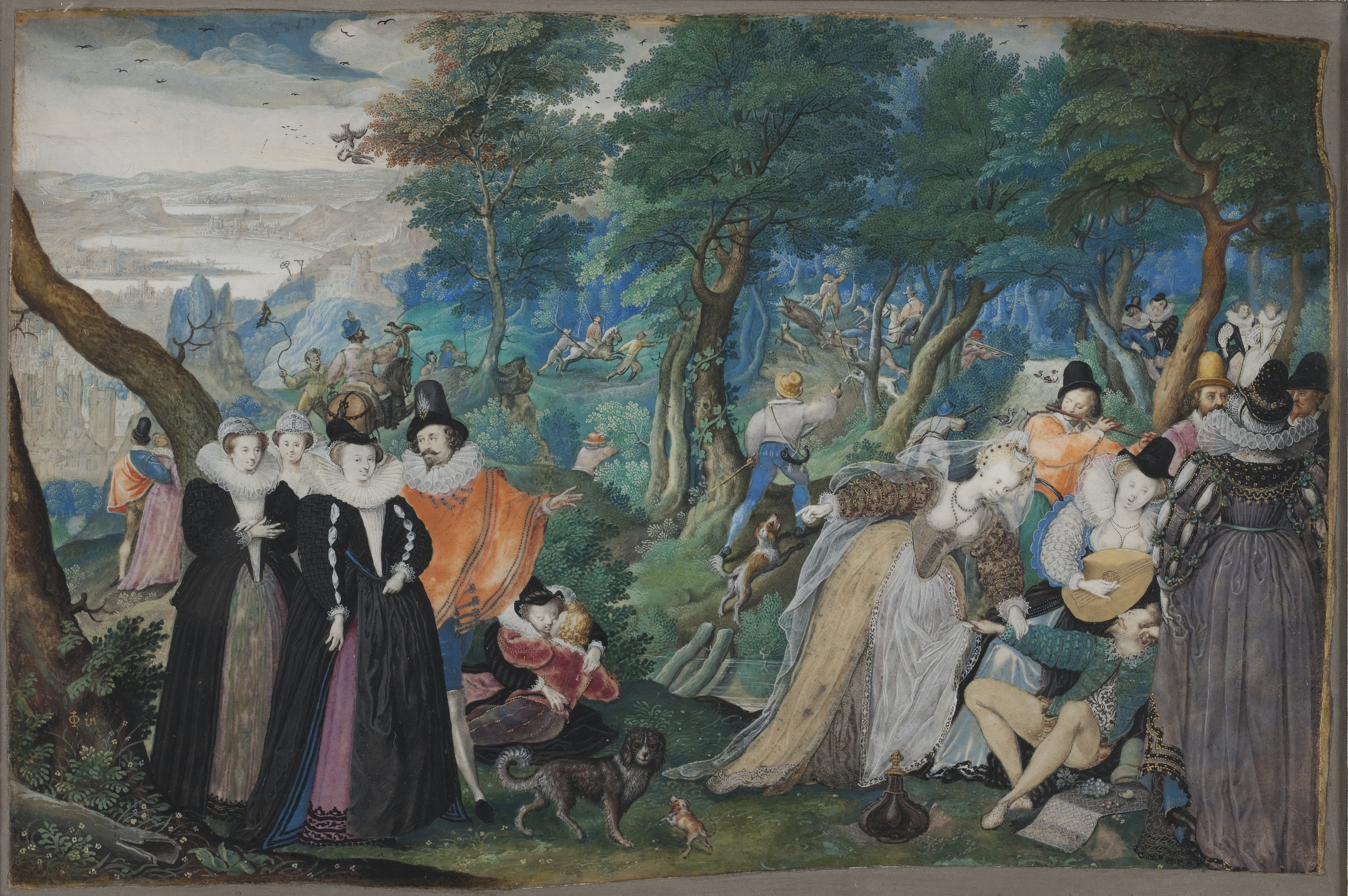
Isaac Oliver's allegorical painting of 1590–95 contrasts virtuous and licentious dress and behavior.

=== Spanish style ===
Charles V, king of Spain, Naples, and Sicily and Holy Roman Emperor, handed over the kingdom of Spain to his son Philip II and the Empire to his brother Ferdinand I in 1558, ending the domination of western Europe by a single court, but the Spanish taste for sombre richness of dress would dominate fashion for the remainder of the century. New alliances and trading patterns arose as the divide between Catholic and Protestant countries became more pronounced. The severe, rigid fashions of the Spanish court were dominant everywhere except France and Italy. Black garments were worn for the most formal occasions. Black was difficult and expensive to dye, and seen as luxurious, if in an austere way. As well as Spanish courtiers, it appealed to wealthy middle-class Protestants. Regional styles were still distinct. The clothing was very intricate, elaborate and made with heavy fabrics such as velvet and raised silk, topped off with brightly coloured jewellery such as rubies, diamonds and pearls to contrast the black backdrop of the clothing. Janet Arnold in her analysis of Queen Elizabeth's wardrobe records identifies French, Italian, Dutch, and Polish styles for bodices and sleeves, as well as Spanish.

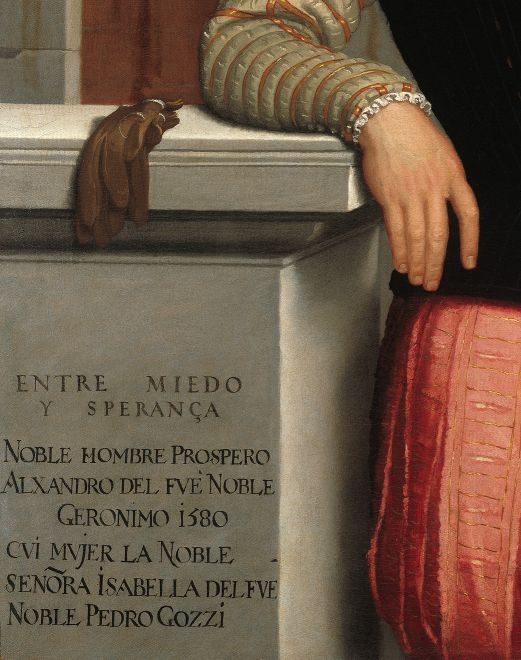
Italian doublet and hose decorated with applied trim and parallel cuts contrast with a severe black jerkin, 1560.

Linen ruffs grew from a narrow frill at neck and wrists to a broad "cartwheel" style that required a wire support by the 1580s. Ruffs were worn throughout Europe, by men and women of all classes, and were made of rectangular lengths of linen as long as 19 yards. Later ruffs were made of delicate reticella, a cutwork lace that evolved into the needlelaces of the 17th century.

=== Elizabethan style ===
Since Elizabeth I, Queen of England, was the ruler, women's fashion became one of the most important aspects of this period. As the Queen was always required to have a pure image, and although women's fashion became increasingly seductive, the idea of the perfect Elizabethan women was never forgotten. "Padding and quilting together with the use of whalebone or buckram for stiffening purposes were used to gain geometric effect with emphasis on giving the illusion of a small waist".

The Elizabethan era had its own customs and social rules that were reflected in their fashion. Style would depend usually on social status and Elizabethans were bound to obey sumptuary laws, which oversaw the style and materials worn. Elizabethan sumptuary laws were used to control behaviour and to ensure that the social structure was maintained. Only royalty was permitted to wear ermine. Other nobles (lesser ones) were allowed only to wear foxes and otters. These rules were well known by all the English people and penalties for violating these sumptuary laws included harsh fines. When enforced, they might result in the loss of property, title, and even life.

Certain materials such as cloth of gold could only be worn by the Queen, her mother, children, aunts, and sisters, as well as duchesses, marchionesses, and countesses. Viscountesses and baronesses, among others, however, were not allowed to wear this material.

Colour use was also restricted during the Elizabethan era depending on social status. Purple was only allowed to be worn by the Queen and her close family members. Depending on social status, the colour could be used in any clothing or would be limited to mantles, doublets, jerkins, or other specific items. Lower classes were only allowed to use brown, beige, yellow, orange, green, grey and blue in wool, linen and sheepskin, while usual fabrics for upper class were silk or velvet.

=== Fabrics and trims ===
The general trend towards abundant surface ornamentation in the Elizabethan Era was expressed in clothing, especially amongst the aristocracy in England. Shirts and chemises were embroidered with blackwork and edged in lace. Heavy cut velvets and brocades were further ornamented with applied bobbin lace, gold and silver embroidery, spangles and oes, and jewels. Toward the end of the period, polychrome (multicoloured) silk embroidery became highly desirable and fashionable for the public representation of aristocratic wealth. The Bacton Altar Cloth is thought to be a remnant of an embroidered skirt from the last years of Elizabeth reign.

The origins of the trend for sombre colours are elusive, but are generally attributed to the growing influence of Spain and possibly the importation of Spanish merino wools. The Low Countries, German states, Scandinavia, England, France, and Italy all absorbed the sobering and formal influence of Spanish dress after the mid-1520s. Fine textiles could be dyed "in the grain" (with the expensive kermes), alone or as an over-dye with woad, to produce a wide range of colours from blacks and greys through browns, murreys, purples, and sanguines. Inexpensive reds, oranges and pinks were dyed with madder and blues with woad, while a variety of common plants produced yellow dyes, although most were prone to fading.

By the end of the period, there was a sharp distinction between the sober fashions favoured by Protestants in England and the Netherlands, which still showed heavy Spanish influence, and the light, revealing fashions of the French and Italian courts. This distinction would carry over well into the seventeenth century.

== Women's fashion ==
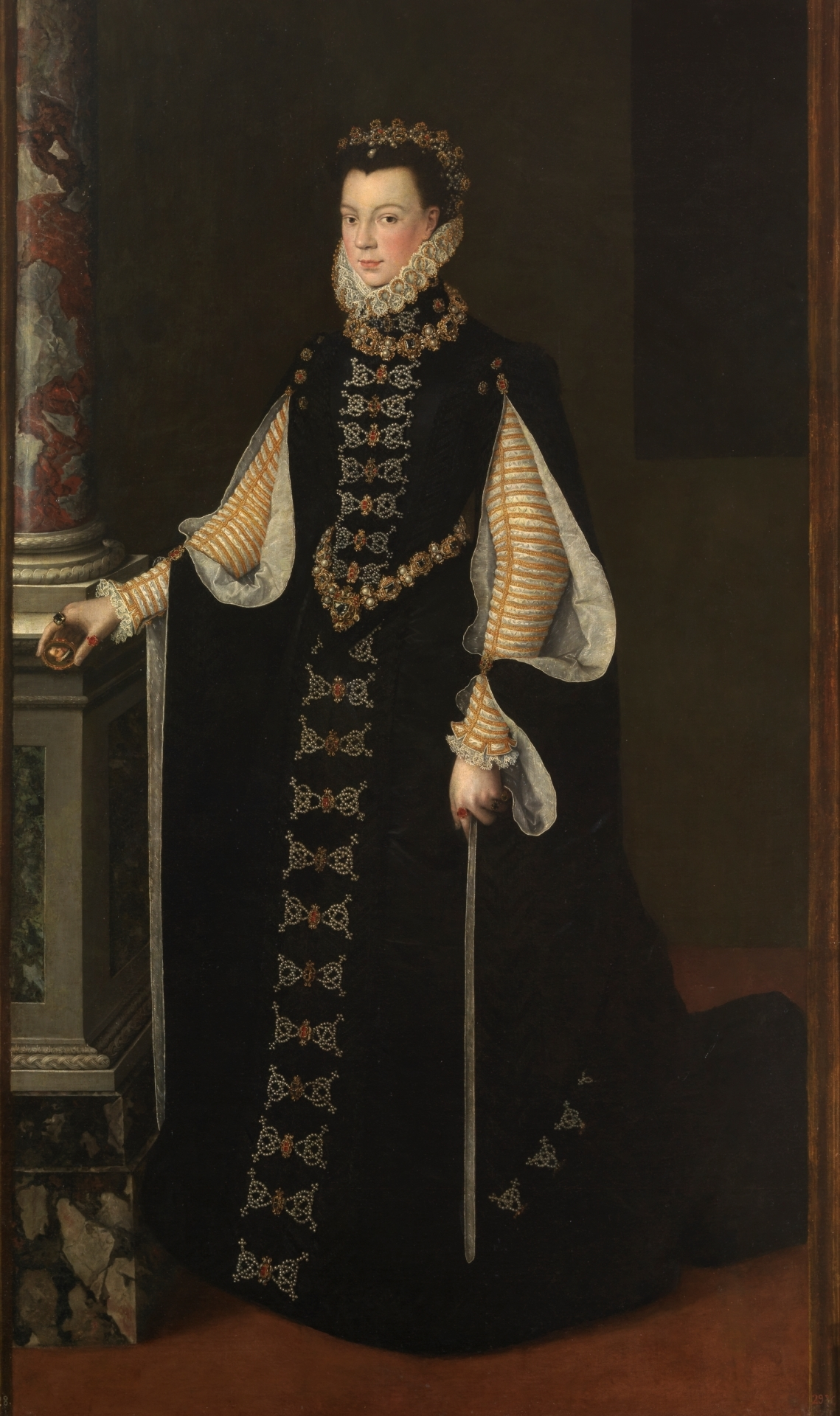
Spanish fashion: Elizabeth of Valois, Queen of Spain, wears a black gown with floor-length sleeves lined in white, with the cone-shaped skirts created by the Spanish farthingale, 1565.

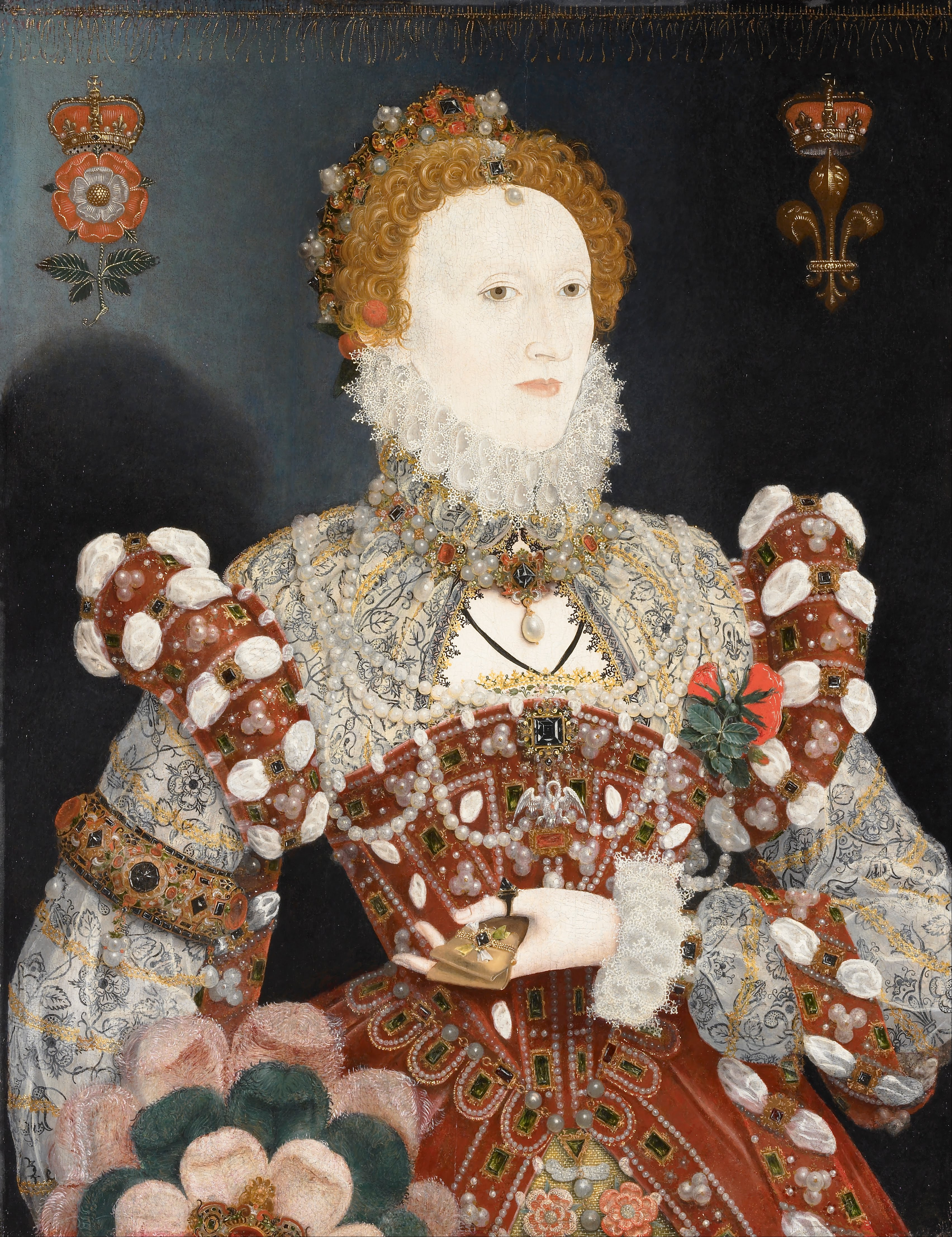
Elizabeth I wears padded shoulder rolls and an embroidered partlet and sleeves. Her low-necked chemise is just visible above the arched bodice, 1572.

Women's outer clothing generally consisted of a loose or fitted gown worn over a kirtle or petticoat (or both). An alternative to the gown was a short jacket or a doublet cut with a high neckline. The narrow-shouldered, wide-cuffed "trumpet" sleeves characteristic of the 1540s and 1550s in France and England disappeared in the 1560s, in favor of French and Spanish styles with narrower sleeves. Overall, the silhouette was narrow through the 1560s and gradually widened, with emphasis at the shoulder and hip. The slashing technique, seen in Italian dress in the 1560s, evolved into single or double rows of loops at the shoulder with contrasting linings. By the 1580s these had been adapted in England as padded and jeweled shoulder rolls.

=== Gown, kirtle, and petticoat ===
The common upper garment was a gown, called in Spanish ropa, in French robe, and in English either gown or frock. Gowns were made in a variety of styles: Loose or fitted (called in England a French gown); with short half sleeves or long sleeves; and floor length (a round gown) or with a trailing train.

The gown was worn over a kirtle or petticoat (or both, for warmth). Prior to 1545, the kirtle consisted of a fitted one-piece garment. After that date, either kirtles or petticoats might have attached bodices or bodies that fastened with lacing or hooks and eyes and most had sleeves that were pinned or laced in place. The parts of the kirtle or petticoat that showed beneath the gown were usually made of richer fabrics, especially the front panel forepart of the skirts.

The bodices of French, Spanish, and English styles were stiffened into a cone or flattened, triangular shape ending in a V at the front of the woman's waist. Italian fashion uniquely featured a broad U-shape rather than a V. Spanish women also wore boned, heavy corsets known as "Spanish bodies" that compressed the torso into a smaller but equally geometric cone. Bodices could be high-necked or have a broad, low, square neckline, often with a slight arch at the front early in the period. They fastened with hooks in front or were laced at the side-back seam. High-necked bodices styled like men's doublets might fasten with hooks or buttons. Italian and German fashion retained the front-laced bodice of the previous period, with the ties laced in parallel rows.

=== Underwear ===
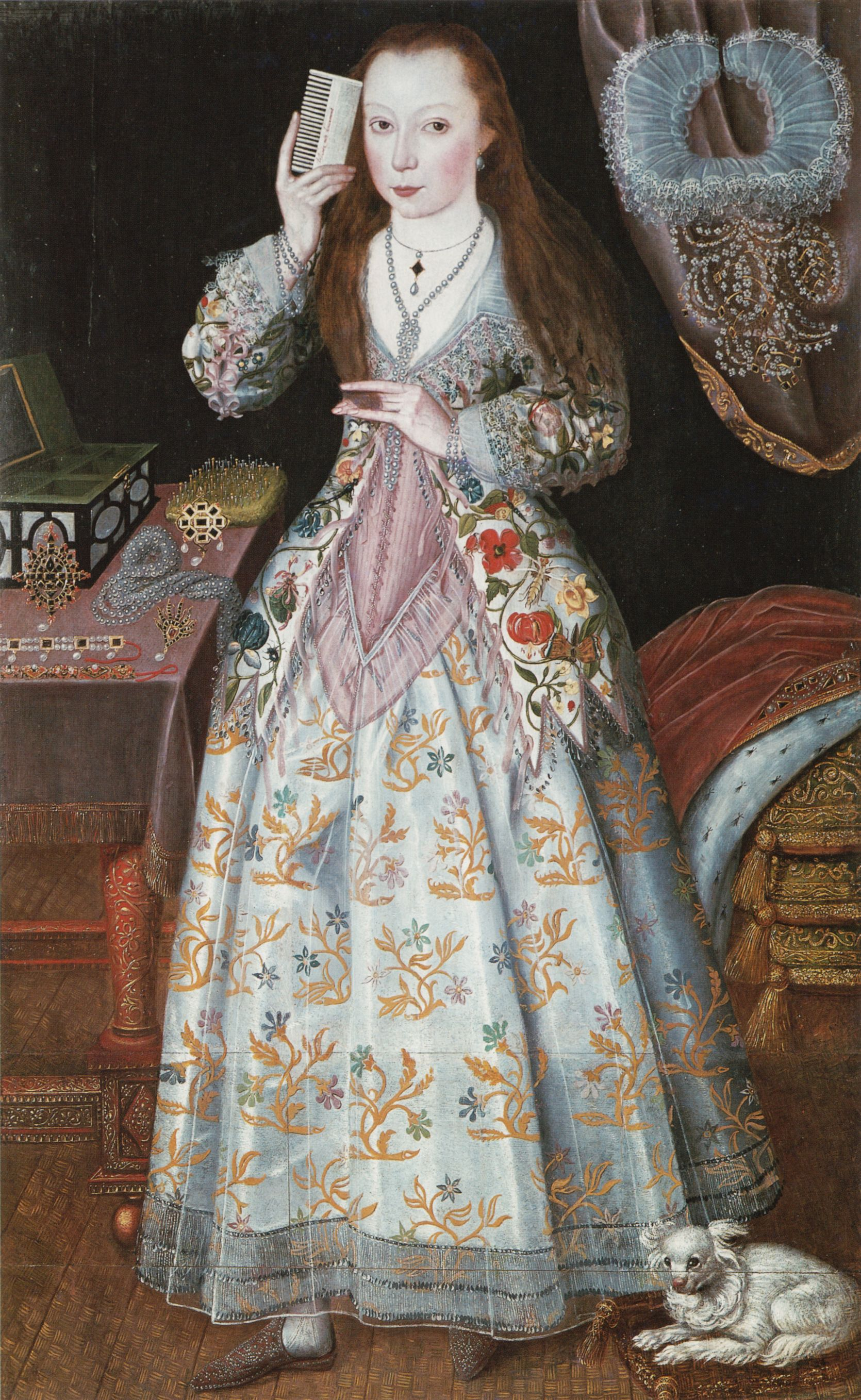
Elizabeth Vernon (later Countess of Southampton) at her dressing table wears an embroidered linen jacket over her rose-pink corset, 1590s.

During this period, women's underwear consisted of a washable linen chemise or smock. This was the only article of clothing that was worn by every woman, regardless of class. Wealthy women's smocks were embroidered and trimmed with narrow lace. Smocks were made of rectangular lengths of linen; in northern Europe the smock skimmed the body and was widened with triangular gores, while in Mediterranean countries smocks were cut fuller in the body and sleeves. High-necked smocks were worn under high-necked fashions, to protect the expensive outer garments from body oils and dirt. There is pictorial evidence that Venetian courtesans wore linen or silk drawers, but no evidence that drawers were worn in England.

Stockings or hose were generally made of woven wool sewn to shape and held in place with ribbon garters.

The first corsets likely originated in sixteenth-century Spain from bodice-like garments that were made with thick fabrics. The fashion spread from there to Italy, and then to France and (eventually) England, where it was called a pair of bodies, being made in two parts which laced back and front. The corset was restricted to aristocratic fashion, and was a fitted bodice stiffened with reeds called bents, wood, or whalebone.

Skirts were held in the proper shape by a farthingale or hoop skirt. In Spain, the cone-shaped Spanish farthingale remained in fashion into the early 17th century. It was only briefly fashionable in France, where a padded roll or French farthingale (called in England a bum roll) held the skirts out in a rounded shape at the waist, falling in soft folds to the floor. In England, the Spanish farthingale was worn through the 1570s, and was gradually replaced by the French farthingale. By the 1590s, skirts were pinned to wide wheel farthingales to achieve a drum shape.

=== Partlet ===
A low neckline might be filled with an infill (called in English a partlet). Partlets worn over the smock but under the kirtle and gown were typically made of lawn (a fine linen). Partlets were also worn over the kirtle and gown. The colours of "over-partlets" varied, but white and black were the most common. The partlet might be made of the same material as the kirtle and richly decorated with lace detailing to complement it. Embroidered partlet and sleeve sets were frequently given to Elizabeth as New Year's gifts.

=== Outerwear ===
Women wore sturdy overskirts called safeguards over their dresses for riding or travel on dirty roads. Hooded cloaks were worn overall in bad weather. One description mentions strings being attached to the stirrup or foot to hold the skirts in place when riding. Mantles were also popular and described as modern day bench warmers: a square blanket or rug that is attached to the shoulder, worn around the body, or on the knees for extra warmth.

Besides keeping warm, Elizabethan cloaks were useful for any type of weather; the Cassock, commonly known as the Dutch cloak, was another kind of cloak. Its name implies some military ideals and has been used since the beginning of the 16th century and therefore has many forms. The cloak is identified by its flaring out at the shoulders and the intricacy of decoration. The cloak was worn to the ankle, waist or fork. It also had specific measurements of 3/4 cut. The longer lengths were more popular for travel and came with many variations. These include: taller collars than normal, upturned collar or no collar at all and sleeves. The French cloak was quite the opposite of the Dutch and was worn anywhere from the knees to the ankle. It was typically worn over the left shoulder and included a cape that came to the elbow. It was a highly decorated cloak. The Spanish cloak or cape was well known to be stiff, have a very decorated hood and was worn to the hip or waist. The over-gown for women was very plain and worn loosely to the floor or ankle length. The Juppe had a relation to the safeguard and they would usually be worn together. The Juppe replaced the Dutch Cloak and was most likely a loose form of the doublet.

=== Accessories ===
The fashion for wearing or carrying the pelt of a sable or marten spread from continental Europe into England in this period; costume historians call these accessories zibellini or "flea furs". The most expensive zibellini had faces and paws of goldsmith's work with jewelled eyes. Queen Elizabeth I received one as a New Years gift in 1584. Gloves of perfumed leather featured embroidered cuffs. Folding fans appeared late in the period, replacing flat fans of ostrich feathers.

Jewelry was also popular among those that could afford it. The collection of jewels owned by Mary, Queen of Scots, and jewels belonging to Queen Elizabeth were documented in inventories, and some of Elizabeth's jewels appear in portraits. Necklaces were beaded gold or silver chains and worn in concentric circles reaching as far down as the waist. Ruffs also had a jewelry attachment such as glass beads, embroidery, gems, brooches or flowers. Cheap imitations of gemstones, pearls, and amber became popular.

Belts were a surprising necessity: used either for fashion or more practical purposes. Lower classes wore them almost as tool belts with the upper classes using them as another place to add jewels and gems alike. Scarves, although not often mentioned, had a significant impact on the Elizabethan style by being a multipurpose piece of clothing. They could be worn on the head to protect desirable pale skin from the sun, warm the neck on a colder day, and accentuate the colour scheme of a gown or whole outfit. The upper class had silken scarves of every color to brighten up an outfit with the gold thread and tassels hanging off of it.

While travelling, noblewomen would wear oval masks of black velvet called visards to protect their faces from the sun.

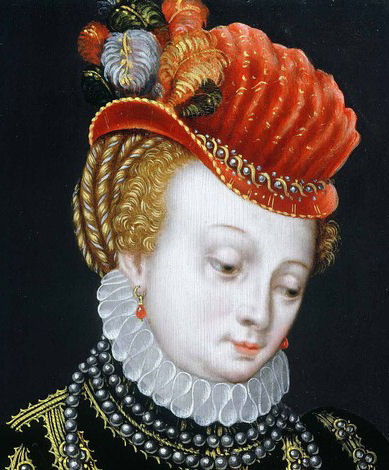
Curled hair, twisted and pinned up

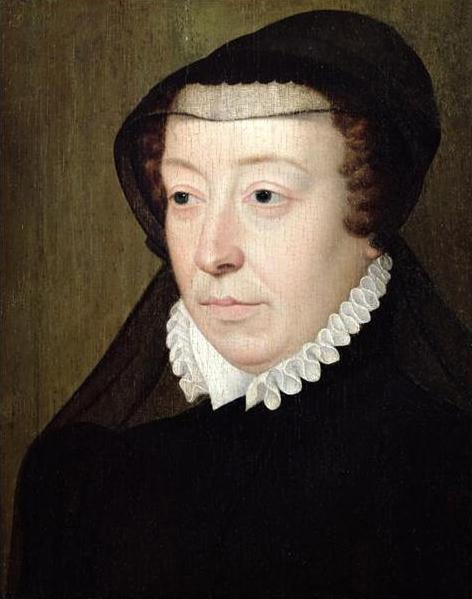
Catherine de' Medici in a widow's black hood and veil, after 1559.

=== Hairstyles and headgear ===
Married and grown women covered their hair, as they had in previous periods. Early in the period, hair was parted in the center and fluffed over the temples. Later, front hair was curled and puffed high over the forehead. Wigs and false hairpieces were used to extend the hair.

In a typical hairstyle of the period, front hair is curled and back hair is worn long, twisted and wound with ribbons and then coiled and pinned up.

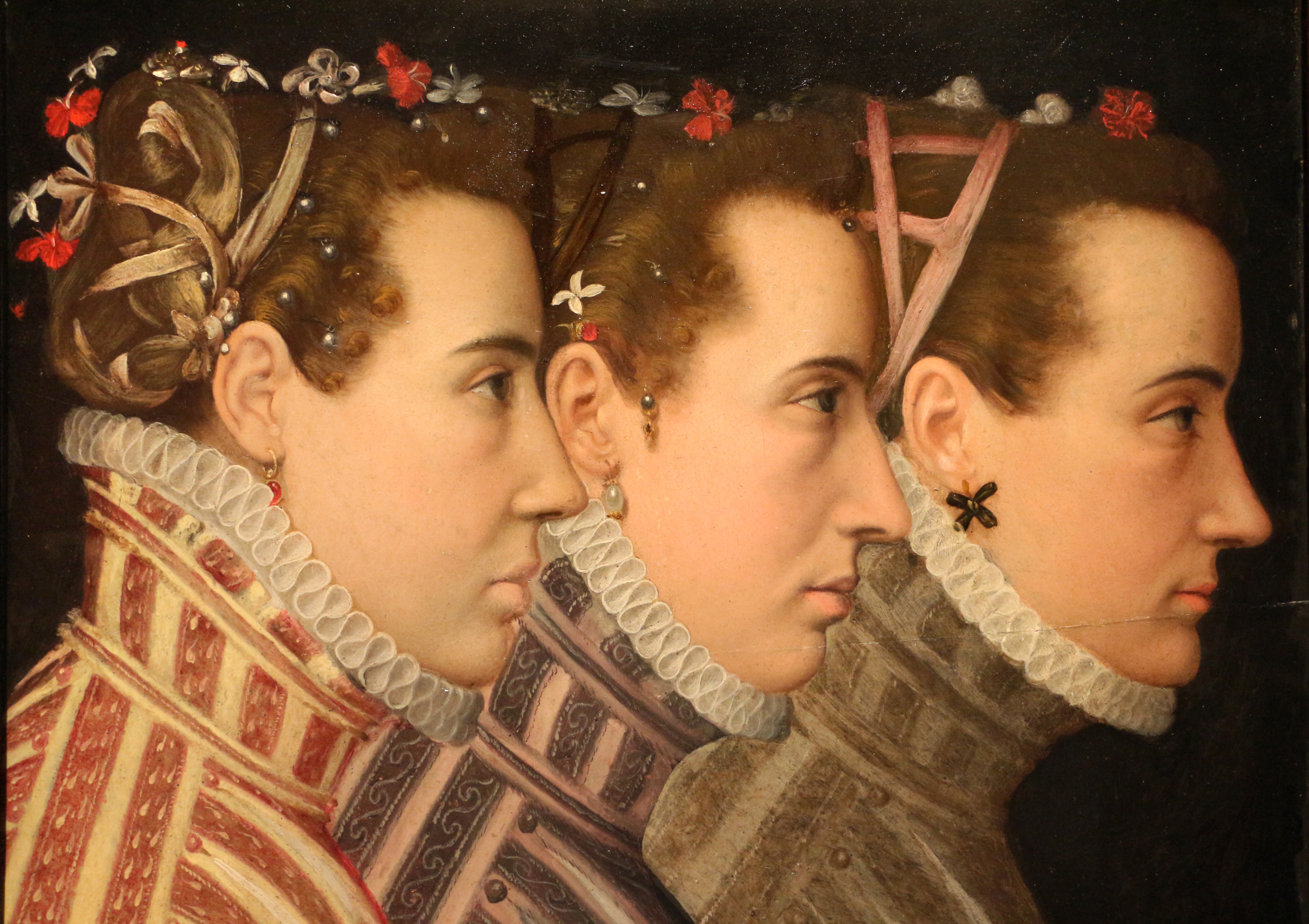
Ribboned hairstyles ca 1570

A close-fitting linen cap called a coif or biggins was worn alone or under other hats or hoods, especially in the Netherlands and England. Many embroidered and bobbin-lace-trimmed English coifs survive from this period.

The French hood was worn throughout the period in both France and England. Another fashionable headdress was a caul, or cap, of net-work lined in silk attached to a band, which covered the pinned-up hair. This style of headdress had also been seen in Germany in the first half of the century. Widows in mourning wore black hoods with sheer black veils.

=== Makeup ===
The ideal standard of beauty for women in the Elizabethan era was to have light or naturally red hair, a pale complexion, and red cheeks and lips, drawing on the style of Queen Elizabeth. The goal was to look very "English," since the main enemy of England was Spain, and in Spain darker hair was dominant.

To further lighten their complexion, women wore white makeup on their faces. This makeup, called Ceruse, was made up of white lead and vinegar. While this makeup was effective, the white lead made it poisonous. Women in this time often contracted lead poisoning, resulting in death before the age of 50. Other ingredients used as makeup were sulfur, alum, and tin ash. In addition to using makeup to achieve a pale complexion, women in this era were bled to take the color out of their faces.

Cochineal, madder, and vermilion were used as dyes to achieve the bright red effects on the cheeks and lips. Kohl was used to darken the eyelashes and enhance the size and appearance of the eyes.

=== Style gallery 1550s ===
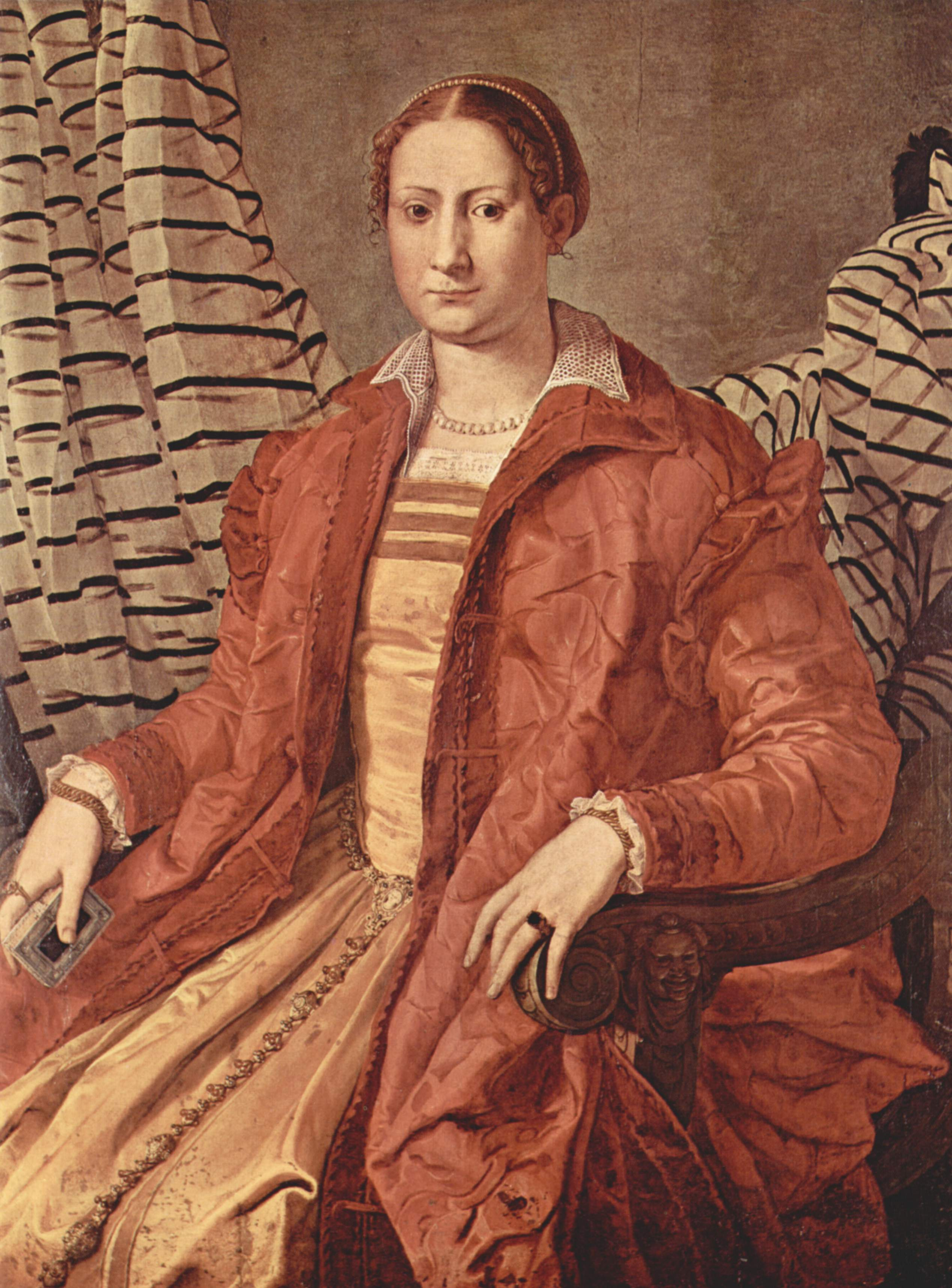
1 – 1550–55

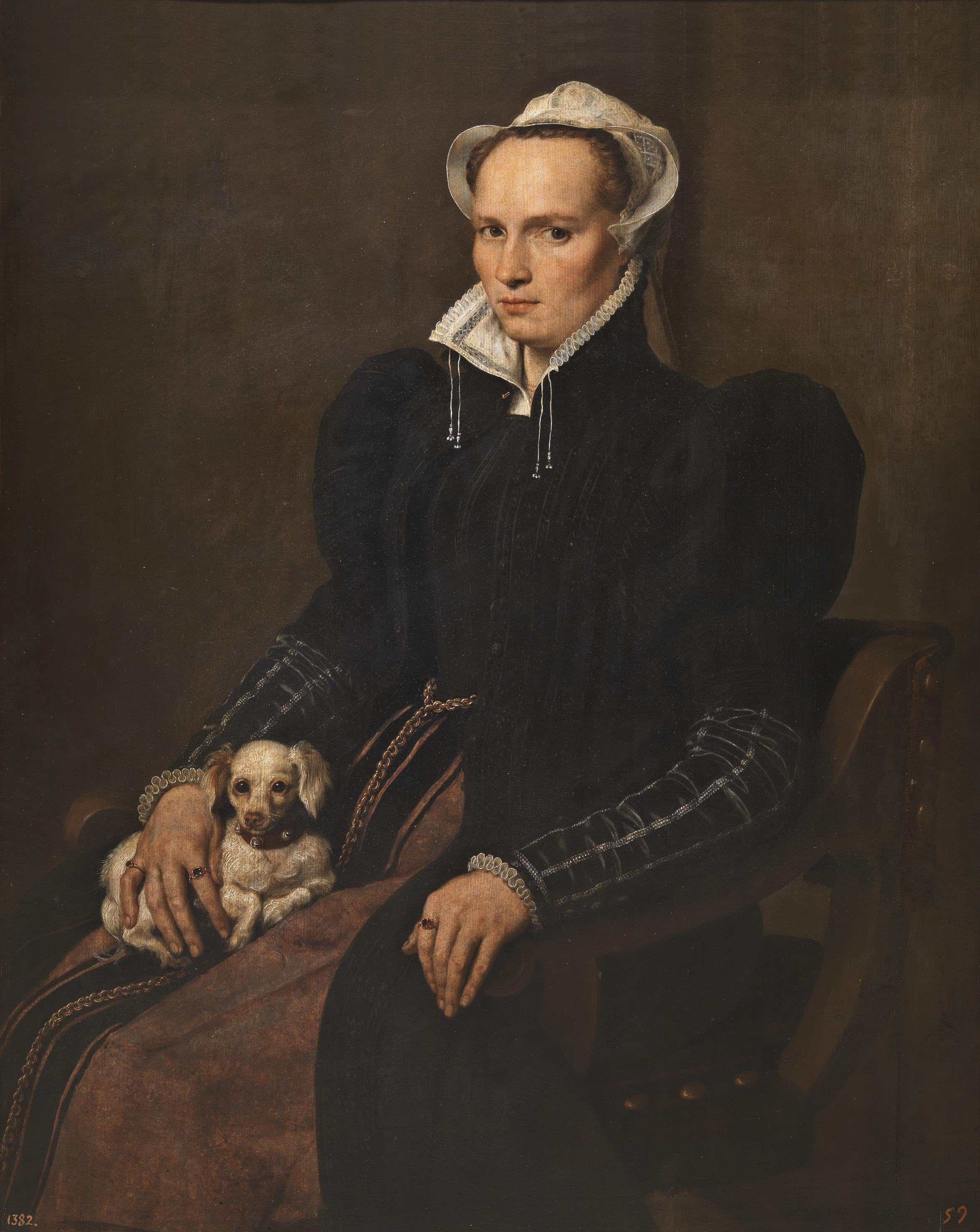
2 – 1554

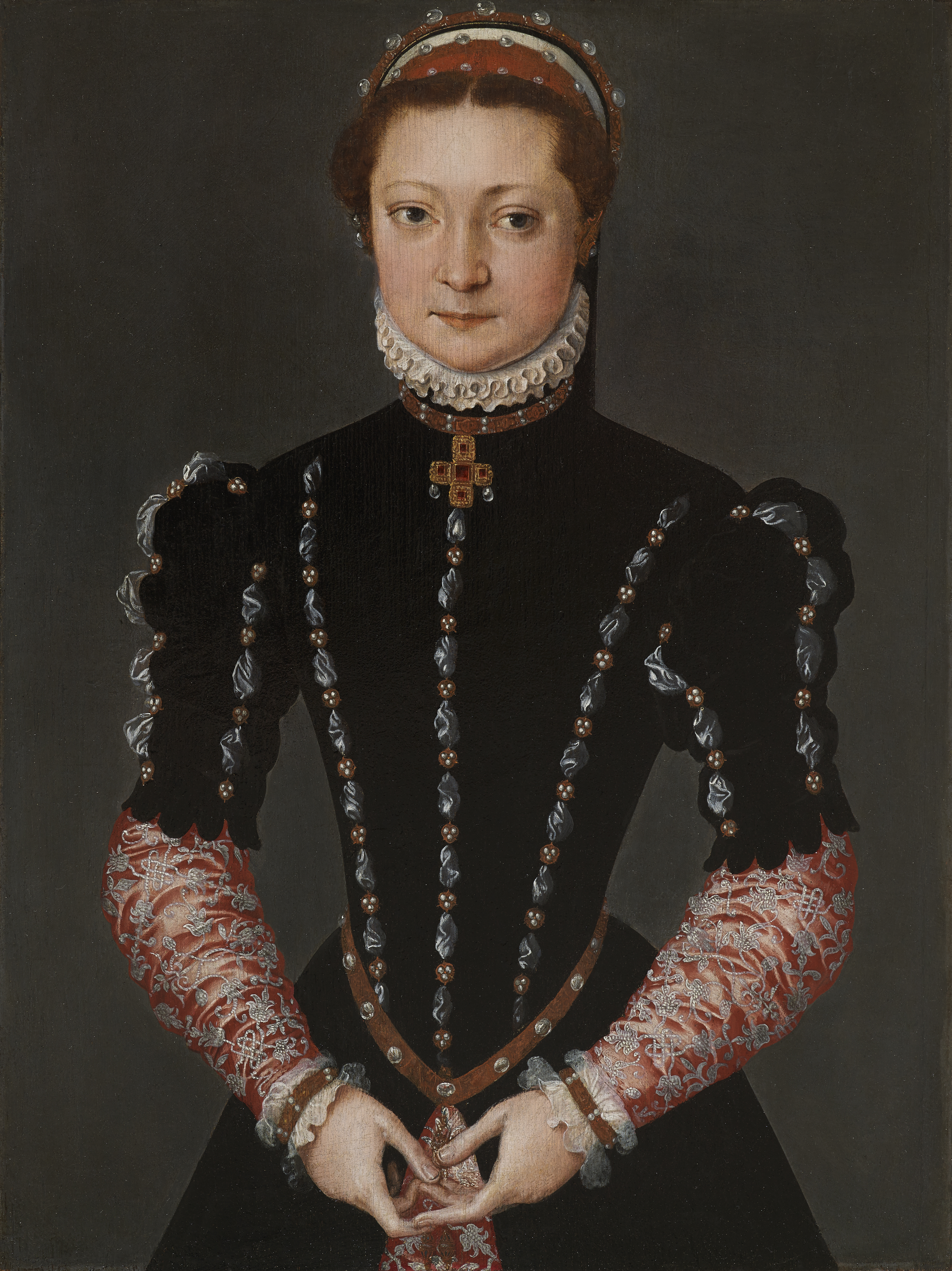
3 – 1554

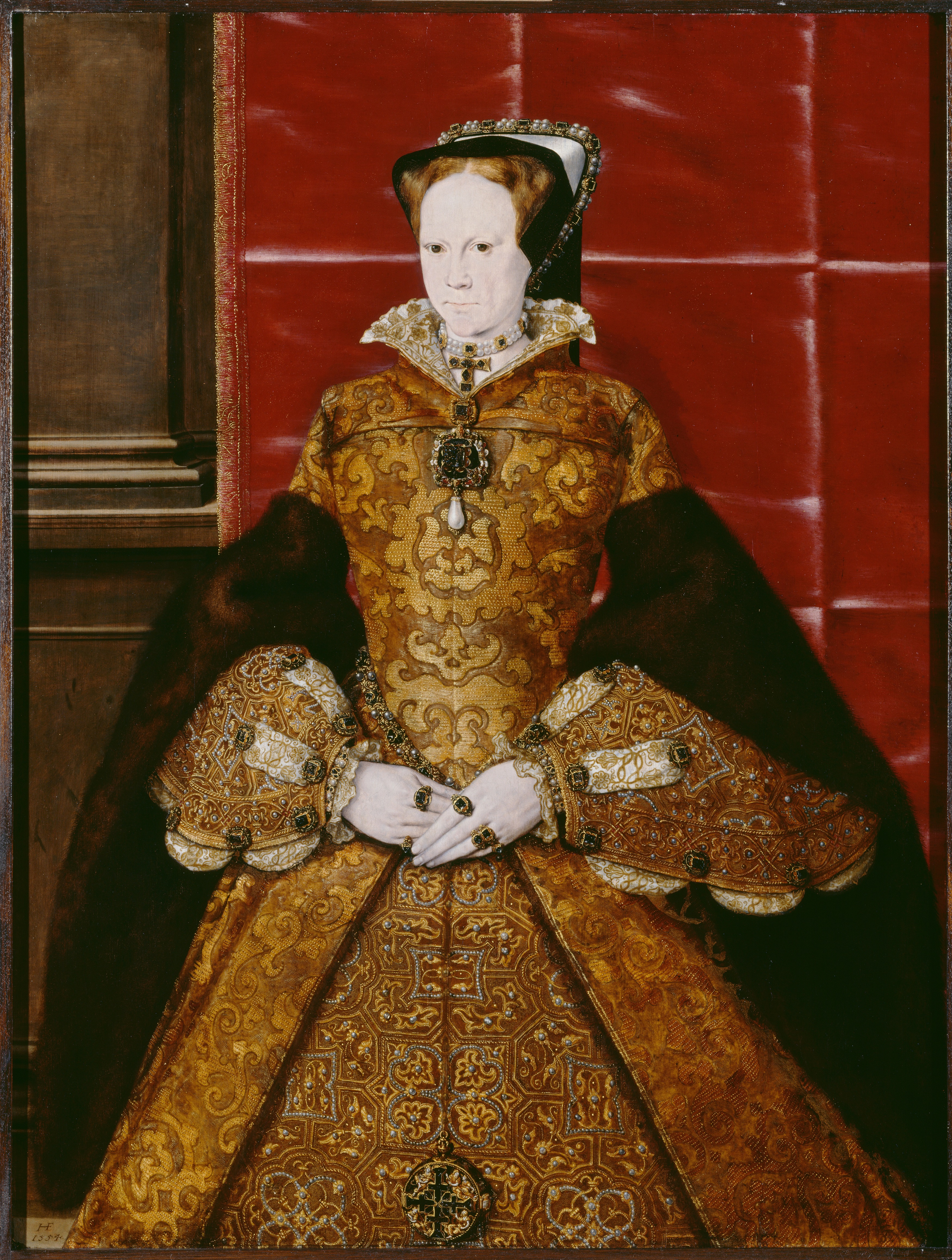
4 – 1554

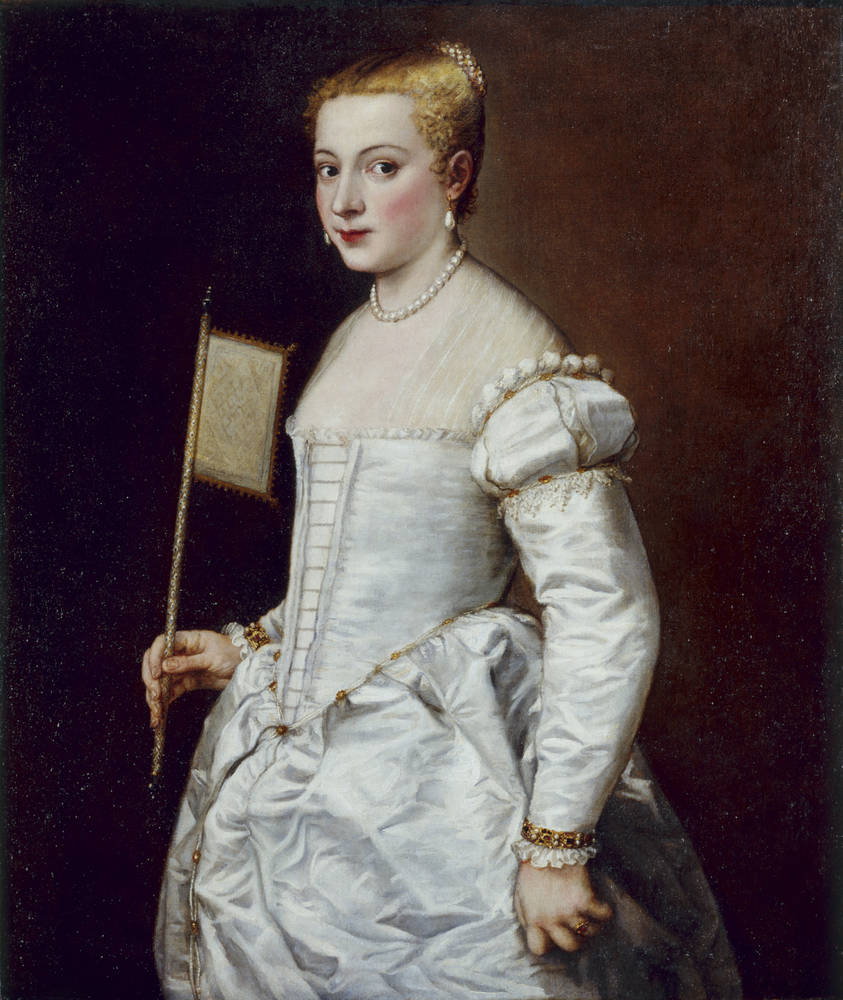
5 – 1555

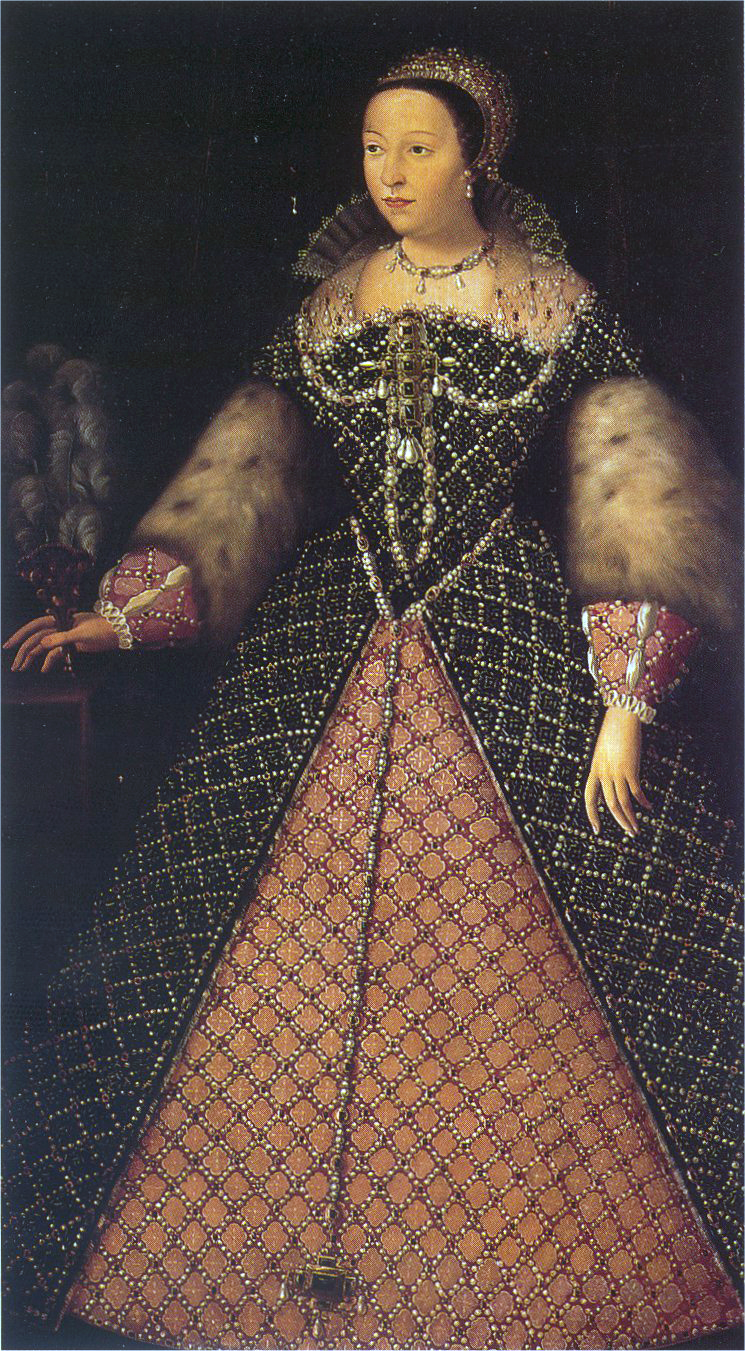
6 – c. 1555

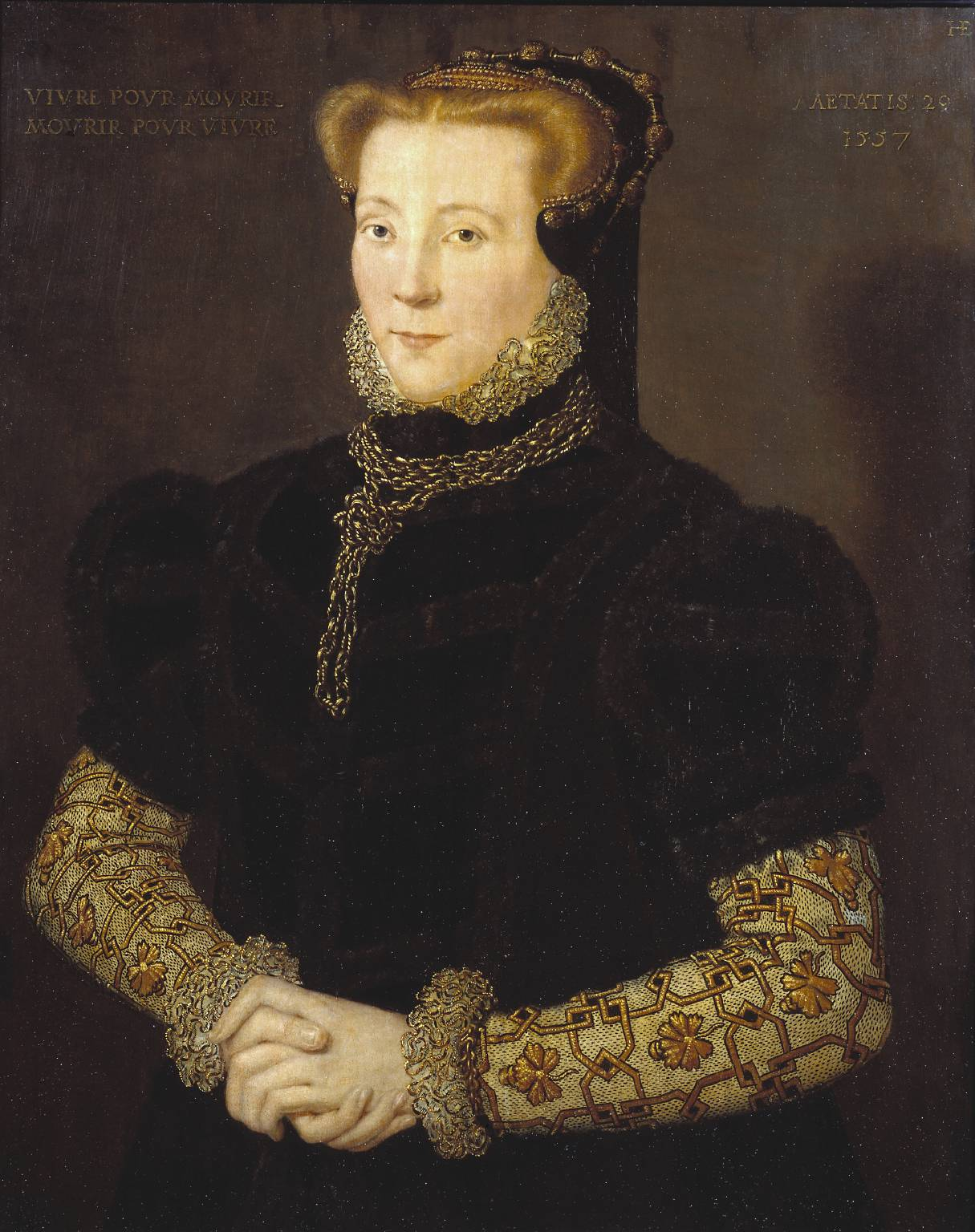
7 – 1557

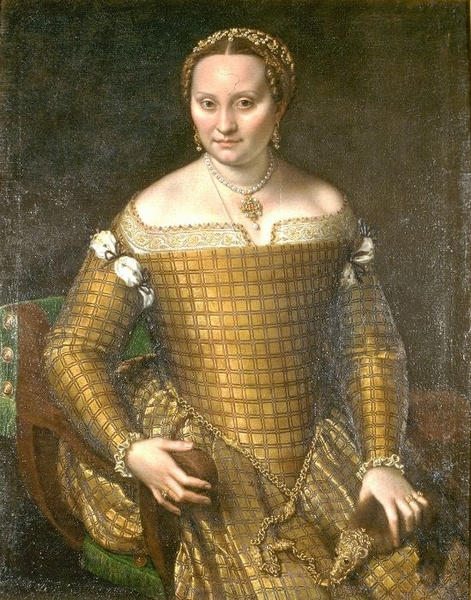
8 – 1557

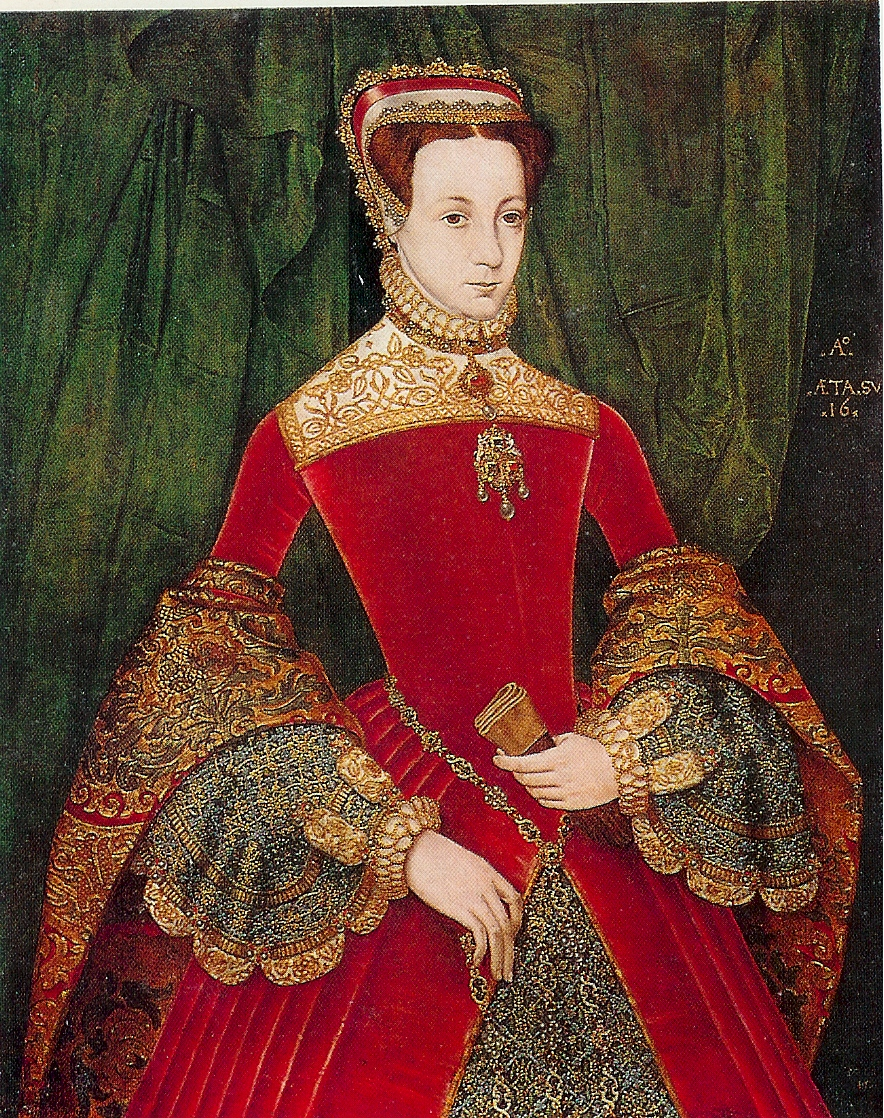
9 - 1557

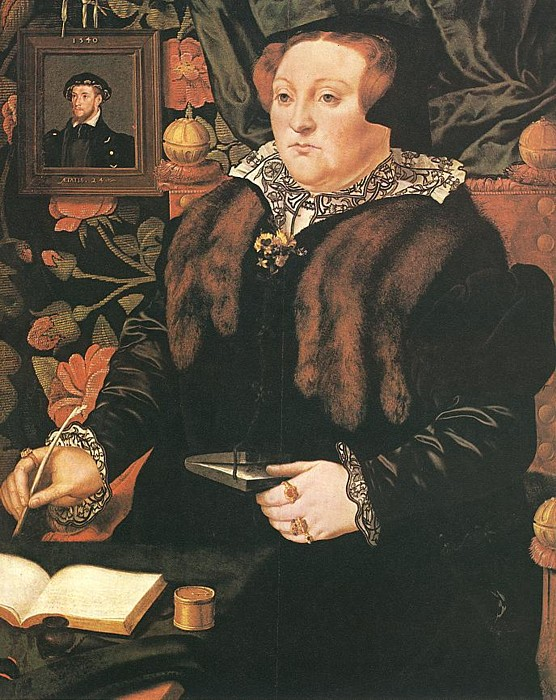
10 – 1555–58
1. Florentine fashion of the early 1550s features a loose gown of light-weight silk over a bodice and skirt (or kirtle) and an open-necked partlet.
2. Dutch fashion of 1554: A black gown with high puffed upper sleeves is worn over a black bodice and a gray skirt with black trim. The high-necked chemise or partlet is worn open with the three pairs of ties that fasten it dangling free.
3. Dutch fashion of 1554: High-necked gown, in Spanish style, trimmed with ruched white silk braid held in place with gold buttons. With ample embroidered sleeves. Hair is covered with a French hood, instead of the traditional white coif, ornamented with pearls.
4. Mary I wears a cloth-of-gold gown with fur-lined "trumpet" sleeves and a matching overpartlet with a flared collar, probably her coronation robes, 1554. Neither the sleeves nor the overpartlet would survive as fashionable items in England into the 1560s.
5. Titian's Lady in White wears Venetian fashion of 1555. The front-lacing bodice remained fashionable in Italy and the German States.
6. Catherine de' Medici in a gown with a high-arched bodice fur-lined "trumpet" sleeves, over a pink forepart and matching paned undersleeves, c. 1555.
7. An unknown woman wears a dark gown trimmed or lined in fur over fitted undersleeves. A chain is knotted at her neck. England, 1557.
8. Bianca Ponzoni Anguissola wears a gold-colored gown with tied-on sleeves and a chemise with a wide band of gold embroidery at the neckline. She holds a jewelled fur or zibellino suspended from her waist by a gold chain, Lombardy (Northern Italy), 1557.
9. Mary Howard, Duchess of Norfolk wears a cloth-of-red velvet gown with "trumpet" sleeves and a gold neckline with a gold embroidered overpartlet, 1557.
10. The widowed Mary Nevill, Baroness Dacre wears a black gown (probably velvet) over black satin sleeves. Her collar lining and chemise are embroidered with blackwork, and she wears a black hood and a fur tippet over her shoulders, later 1550s.

=== Style gallery 1560s ===
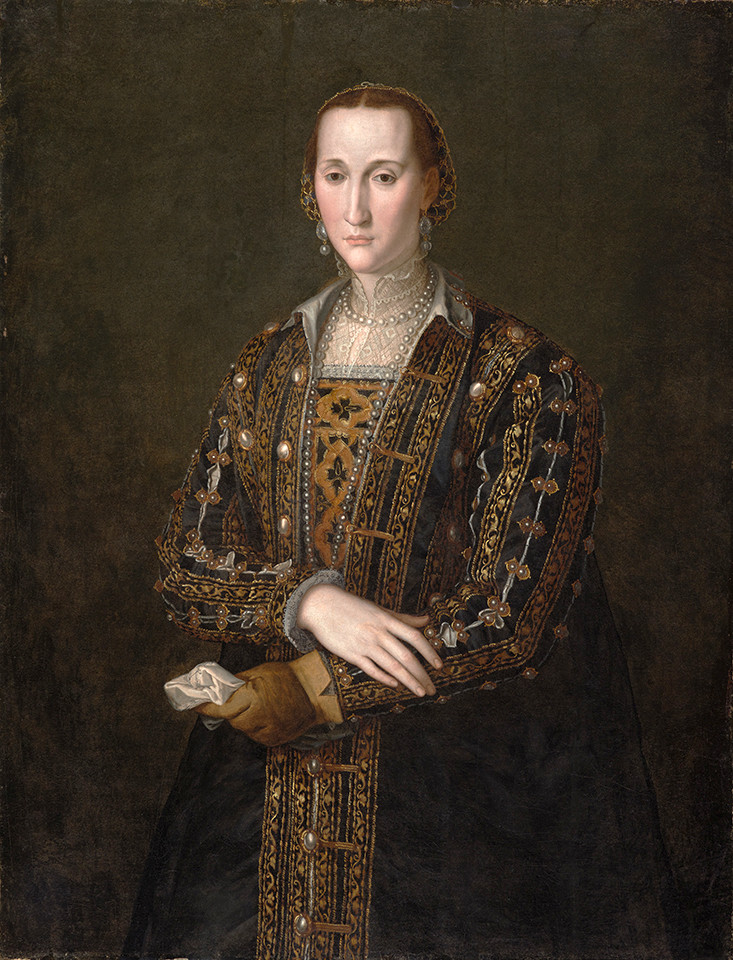
1 – 1560

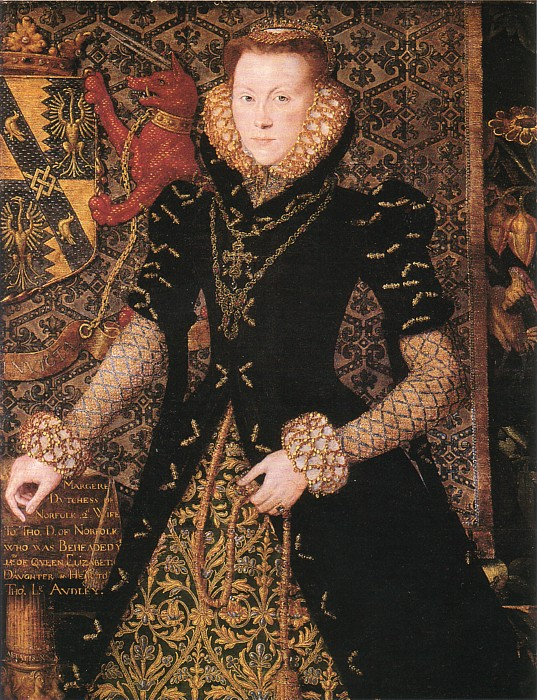
2 – 1562

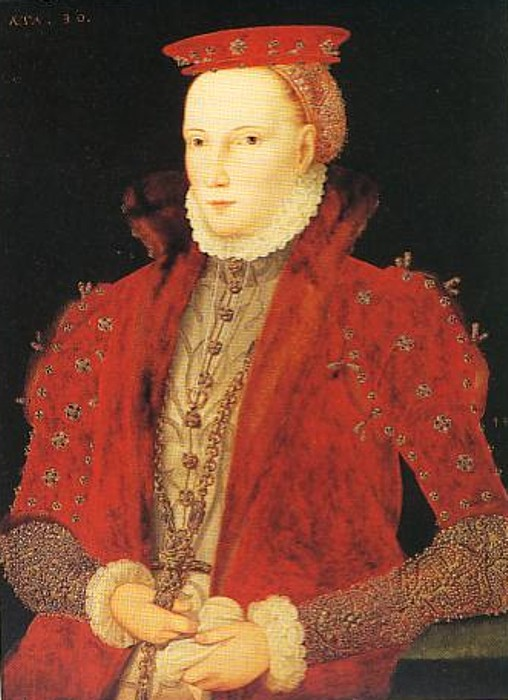
3 – 1563

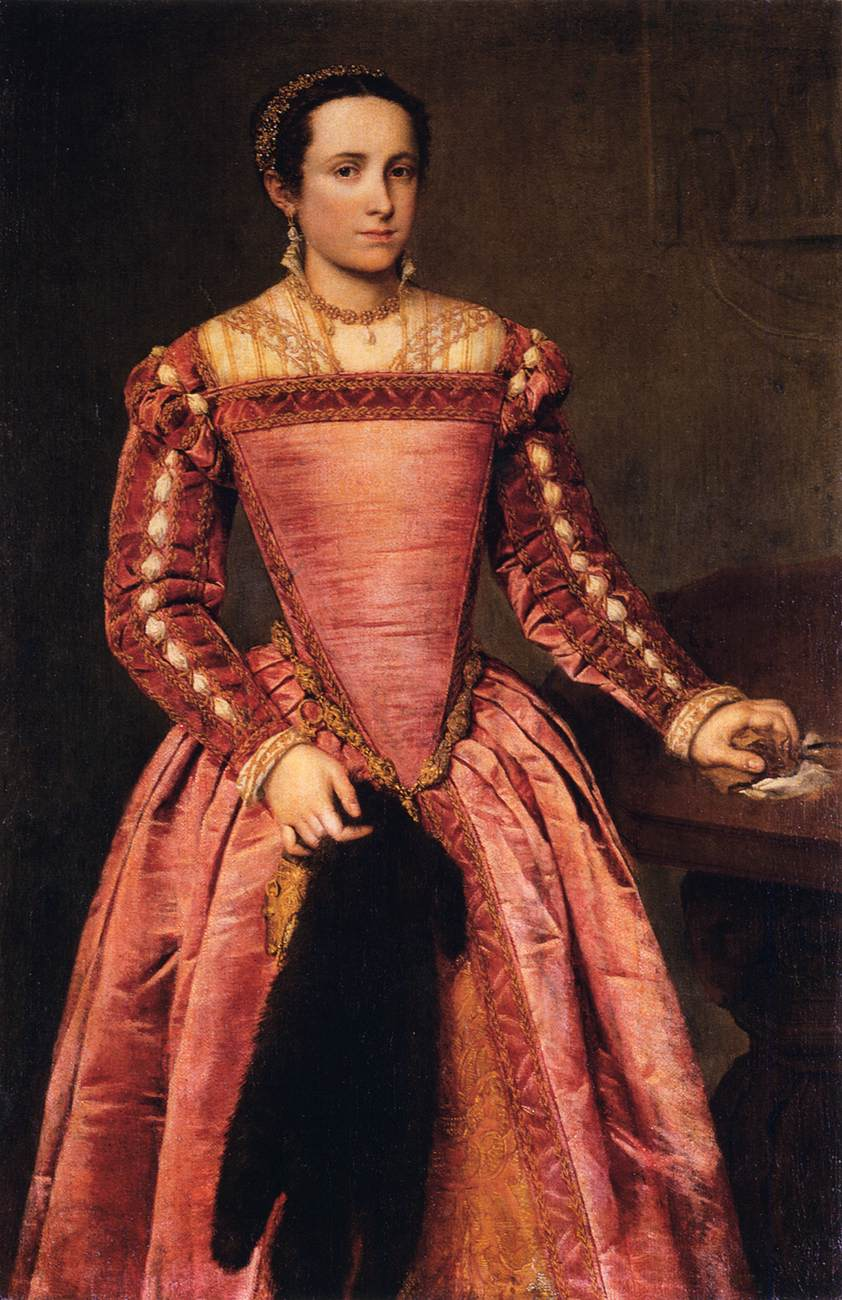
4 – 1560s

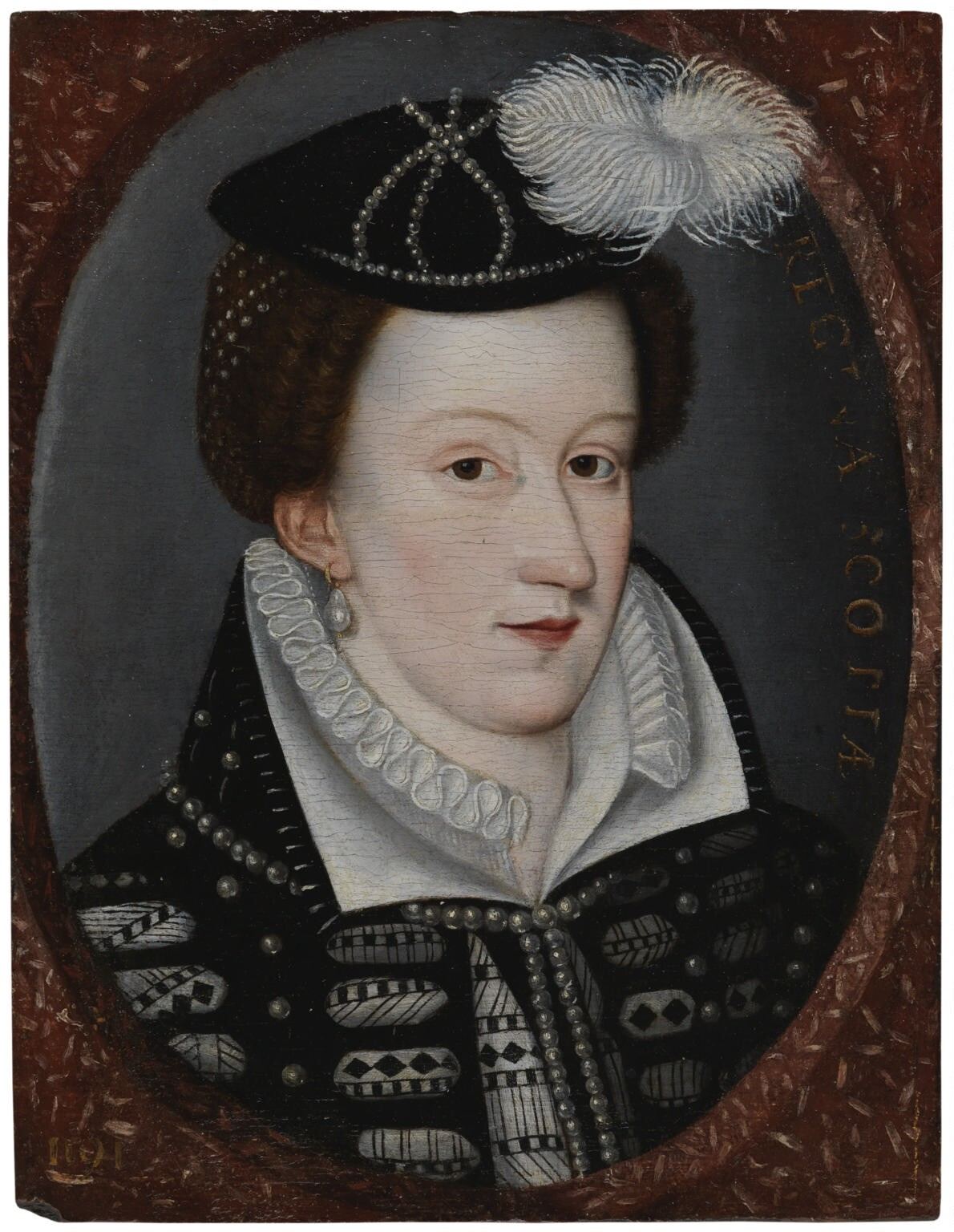
5 – 1560s

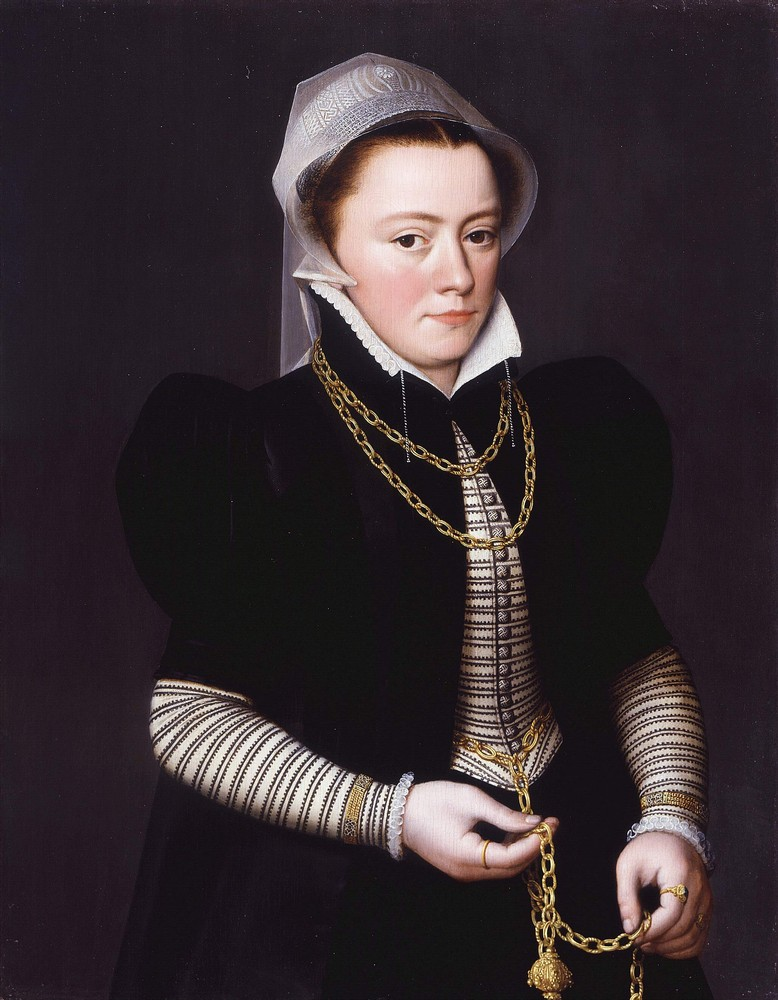
6 – 1560–65

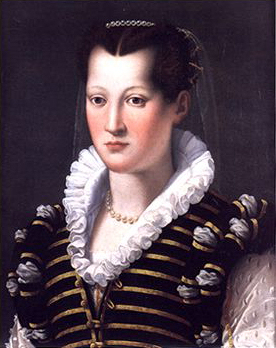
7 - 1560–65

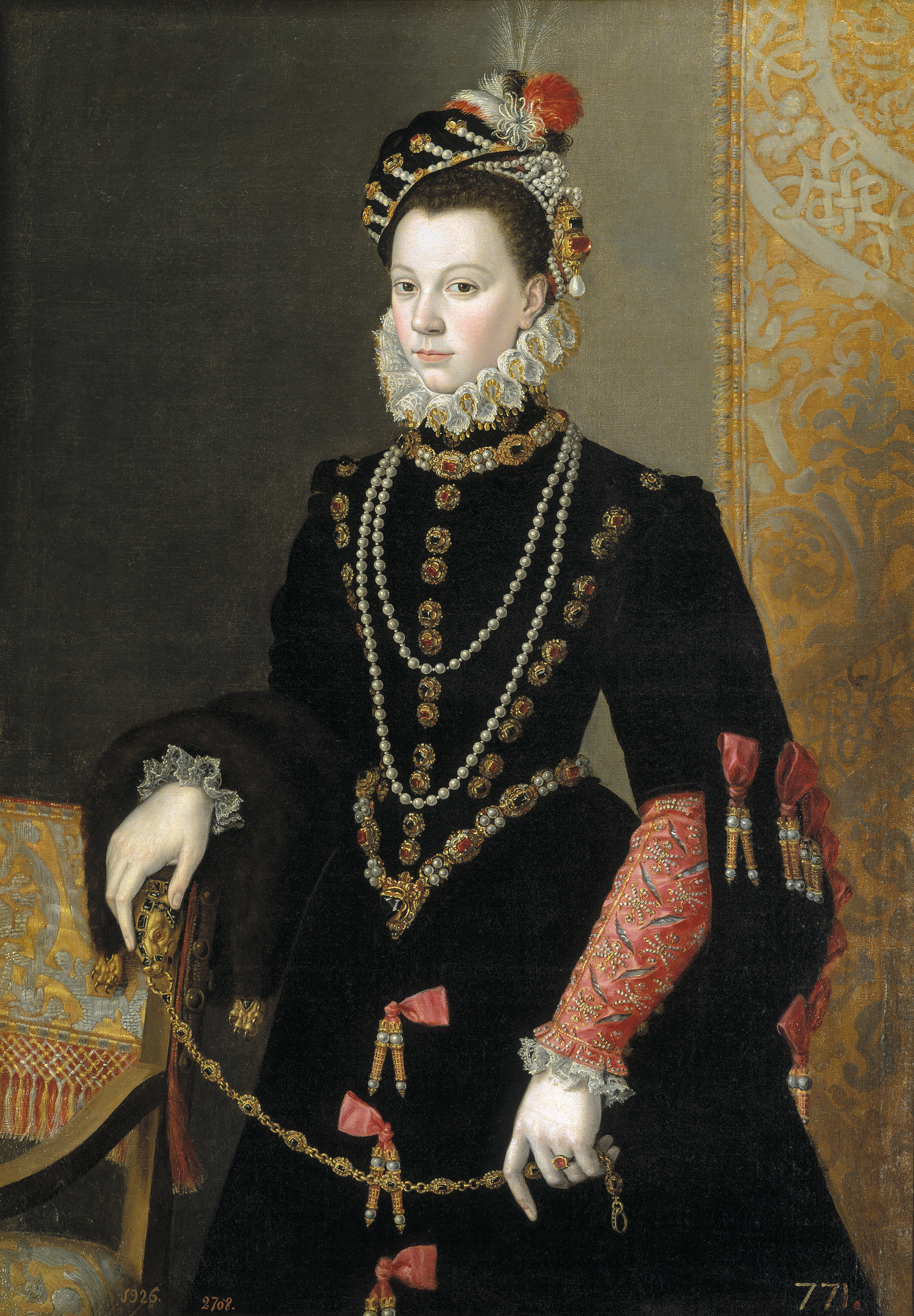
8 – 1560s

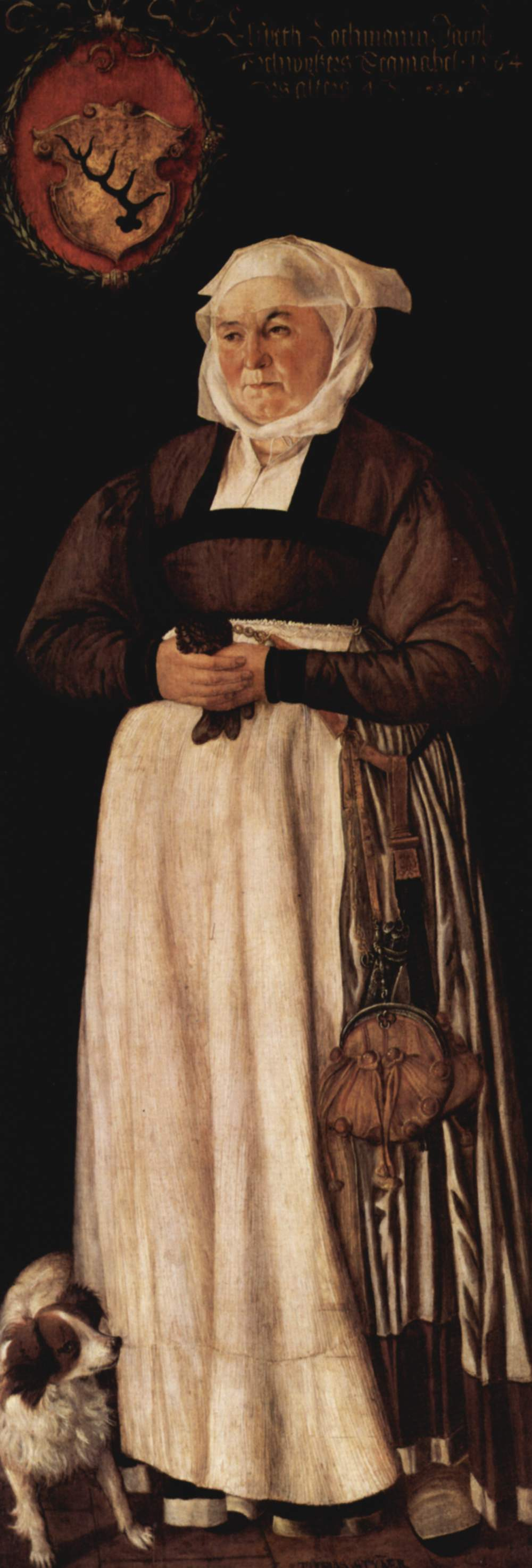
9 – 1564

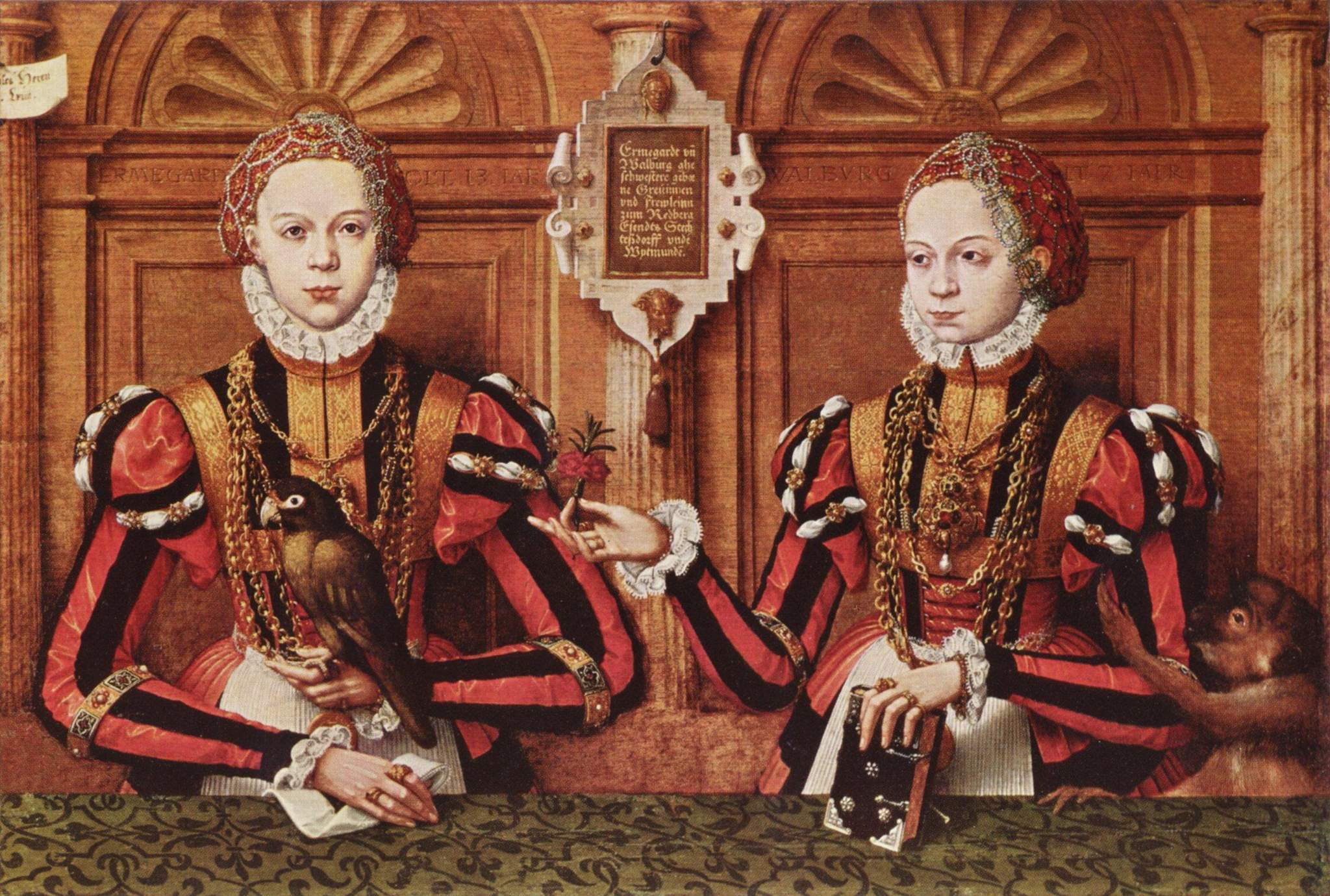
10 – 1564
1. Eleanor of Toledo wears a black loose gown over a bodice and a sheer linen partlet. Her brown gloves have tan cuffs, 1560.
2. Margaret Audley, Duchess of Norfolk wears the high-collared gown of the 1560s with puffed hanging sleeves. Under it she wears a high-necked bodice and tight undersleeves and a petticoat with an elaborately embroidered forepart, 1562.
3. The Gripsholm Portrait, thought to be Elizabeth I, shows her wearing a red gown with a fur lining. She wears a red flat hat over a small cap or caul that confines her hair.
4. Woman wearing a red silk dress, with slashed sleeves.
5. Mary Queen of Scots wears an open French collar with an attached ruff under a black gown with a flared collar and white lining. Her black hat with a feather is decorated with pearls and worn over a caul that covers her hair, 1560s.
6. Unknown lady holding a pomander wears a black gown with puffed upper sleeves over a striped high-necked bodice or doublet. She wears a whitework cap beneath a sheer veil, 1560–65.
7. Isabella de' Medici's bodice fastens with small gold buttons and loops. A double row of loops trims the shoulder, 1560–65.
8. Isabel de Valois, Queen of Spain in severe Spanish fashion of the 1560s. Her high-necked black gown with split hanging sleeves is trimmed in bows with single loops and metal tags or aiglets, and she carries a jewelled flea-fur on a chain.
9. Portrait of Elsbeth Lochmann in modest German style: she wears a light-colored petticoat trimmed with a broad band of dark fabric at the hem, with a brown bodice and sleeves and an apron. An elaborate purse hangs from her belt, and she wears a linen headdress with a sheer veil, 1564.
10. Sisters Ermengard and Walburg von Rietberg wears German front-laced gowns of red satin trimmed with black bands of fabric. They wear high-necked black over-partlets with bands of gold trim and linen aprons. Their hair is tucked into jewelled cauls, 1564.

=== Style gallery 1570s ===
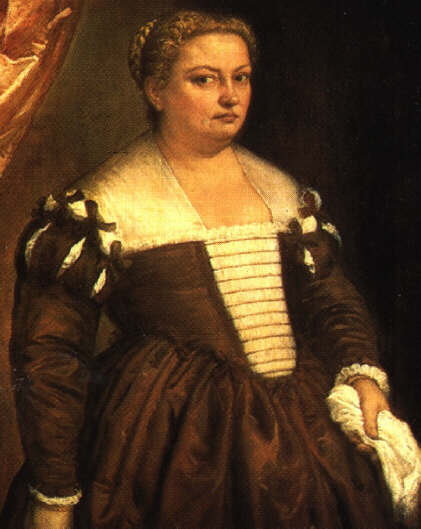
1 – 1570

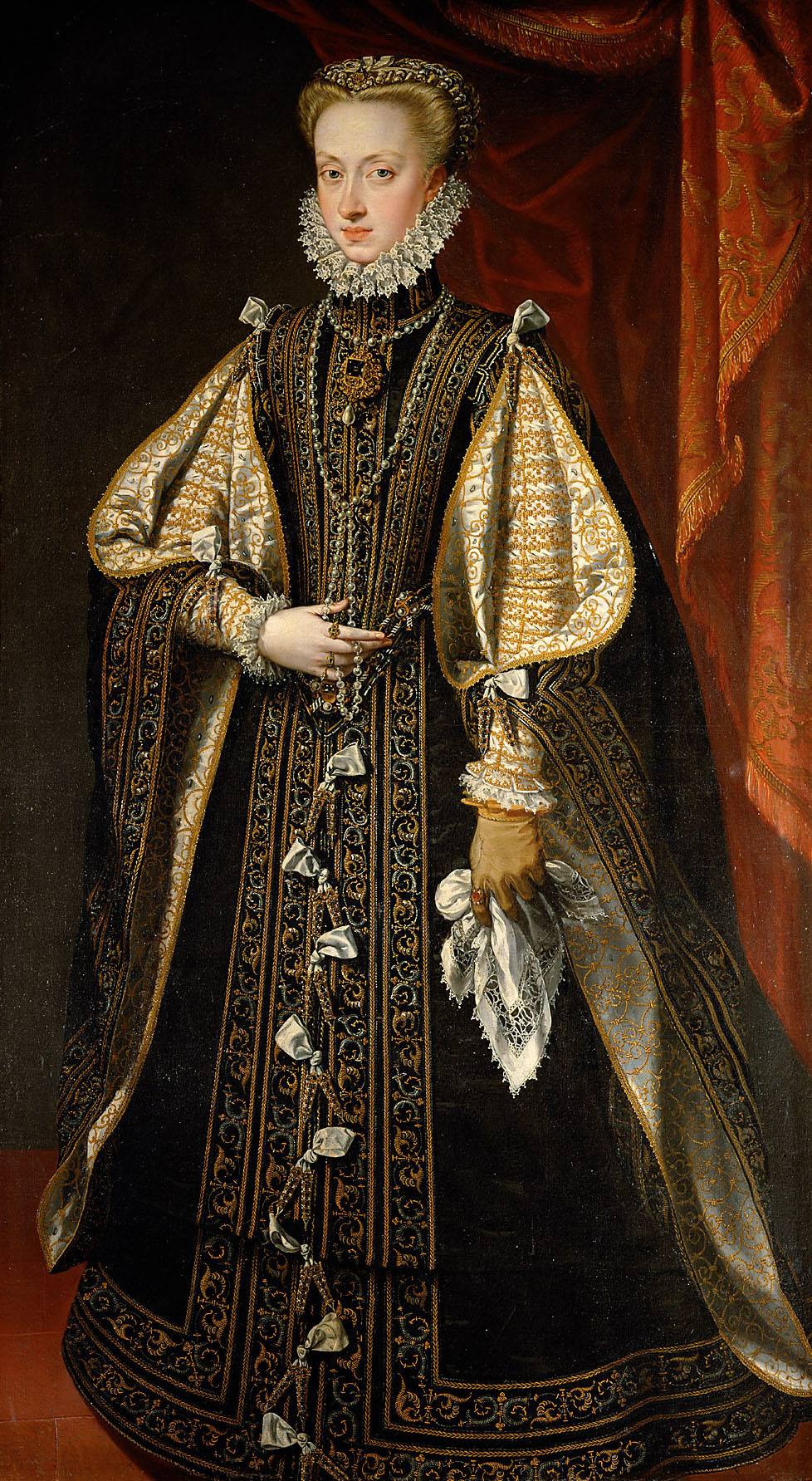
2 - 1571

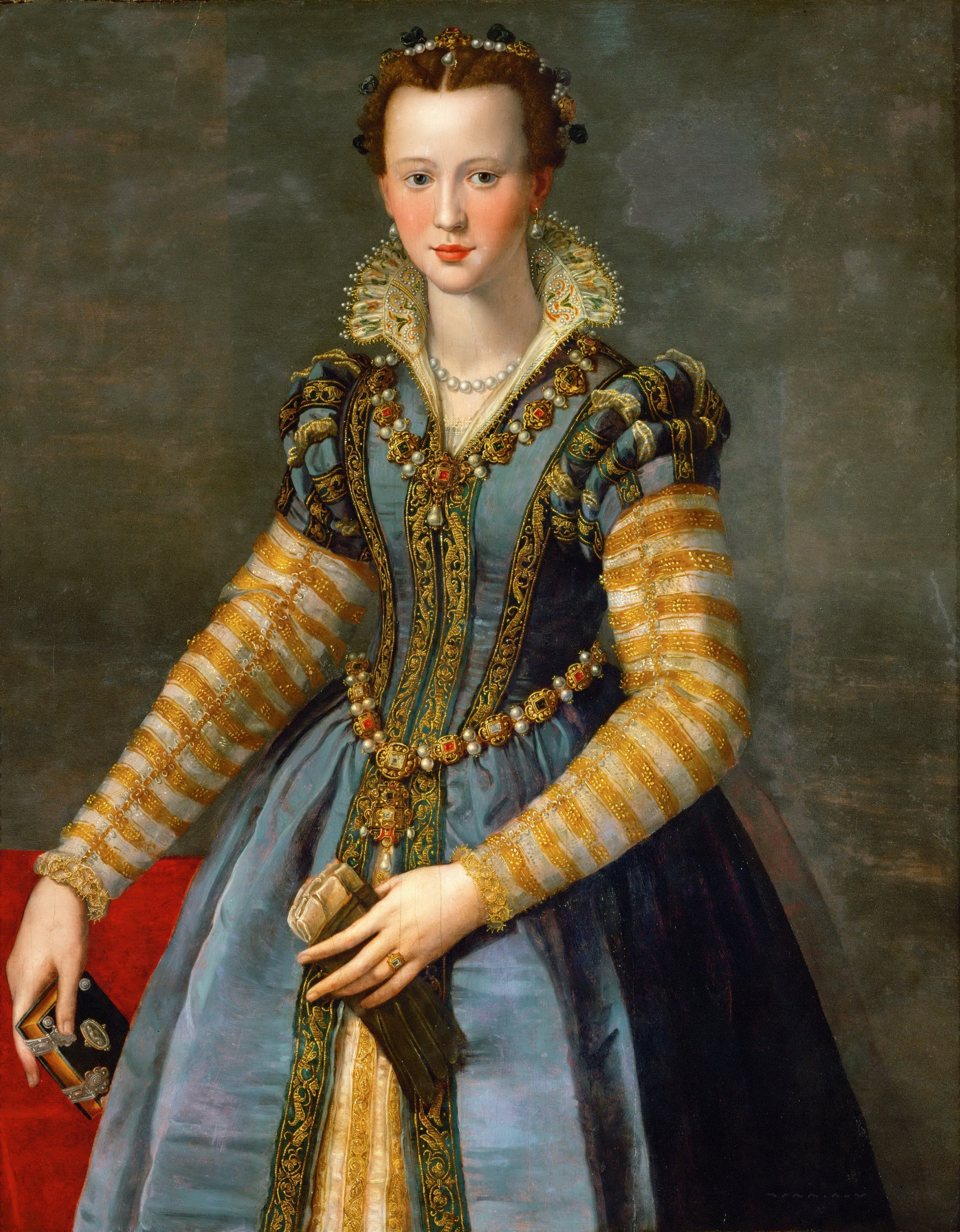
3 – 1571

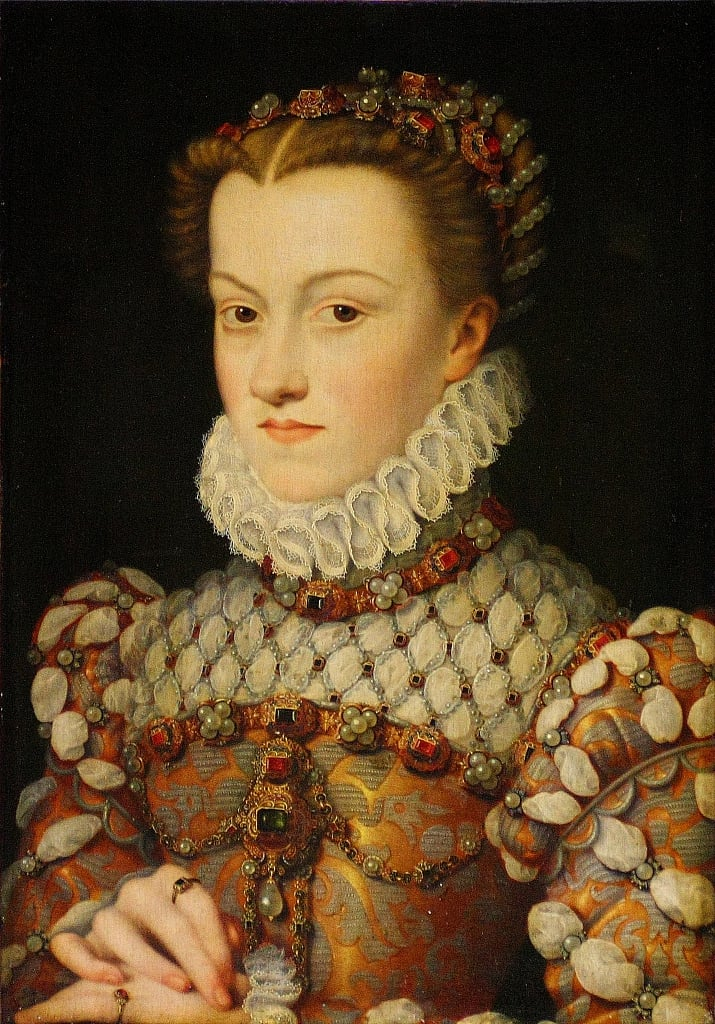
4 – 1571

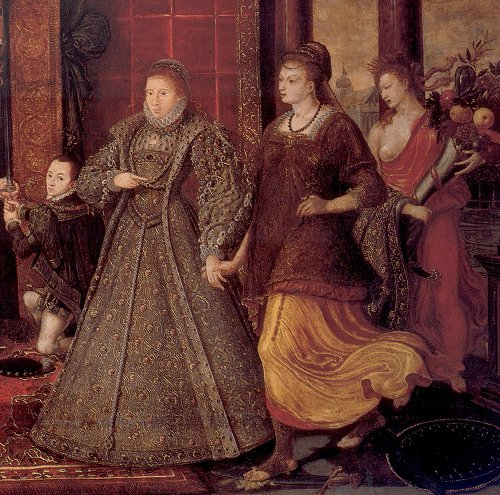
5 – c. 1572

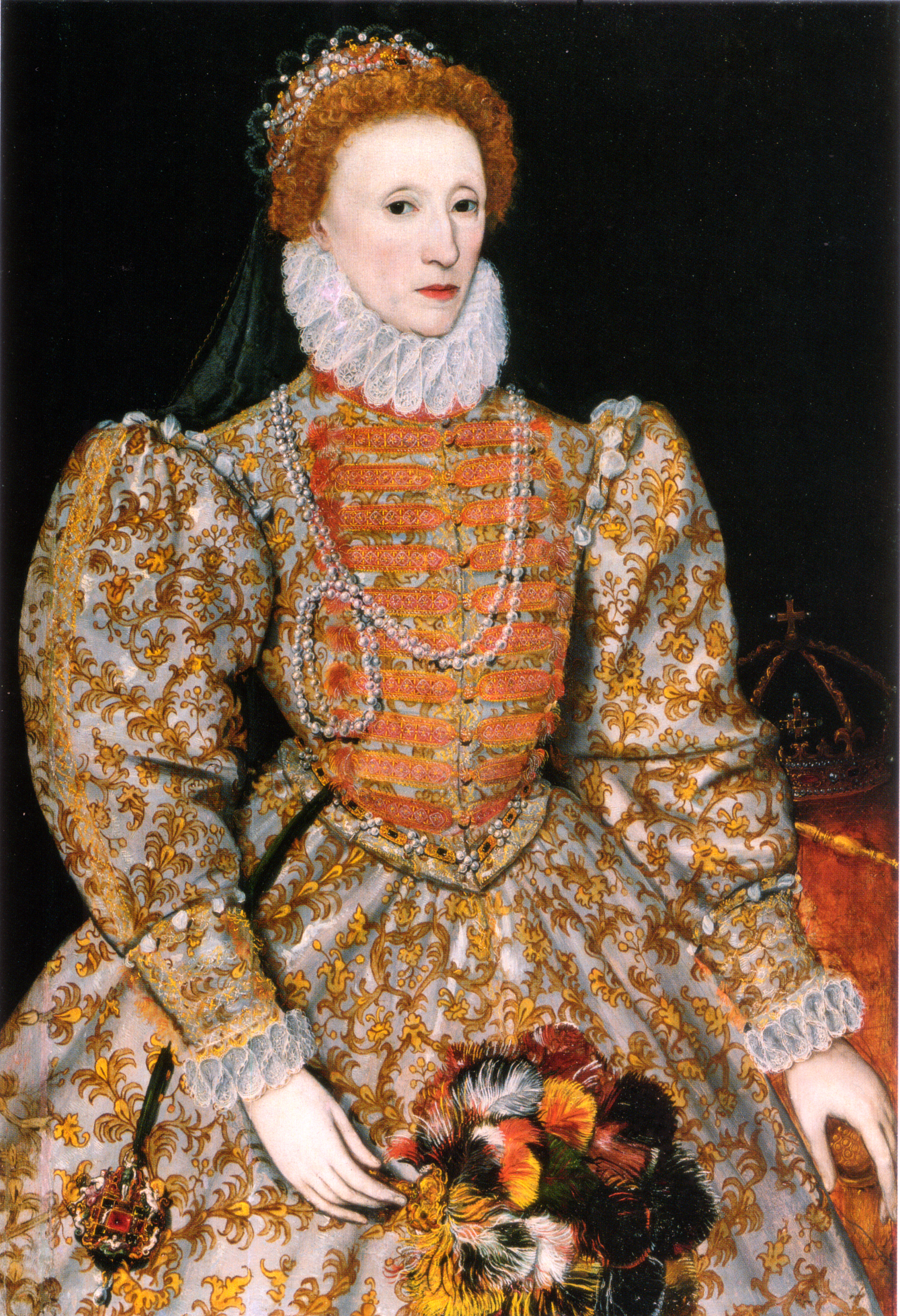
6 – c. 1575

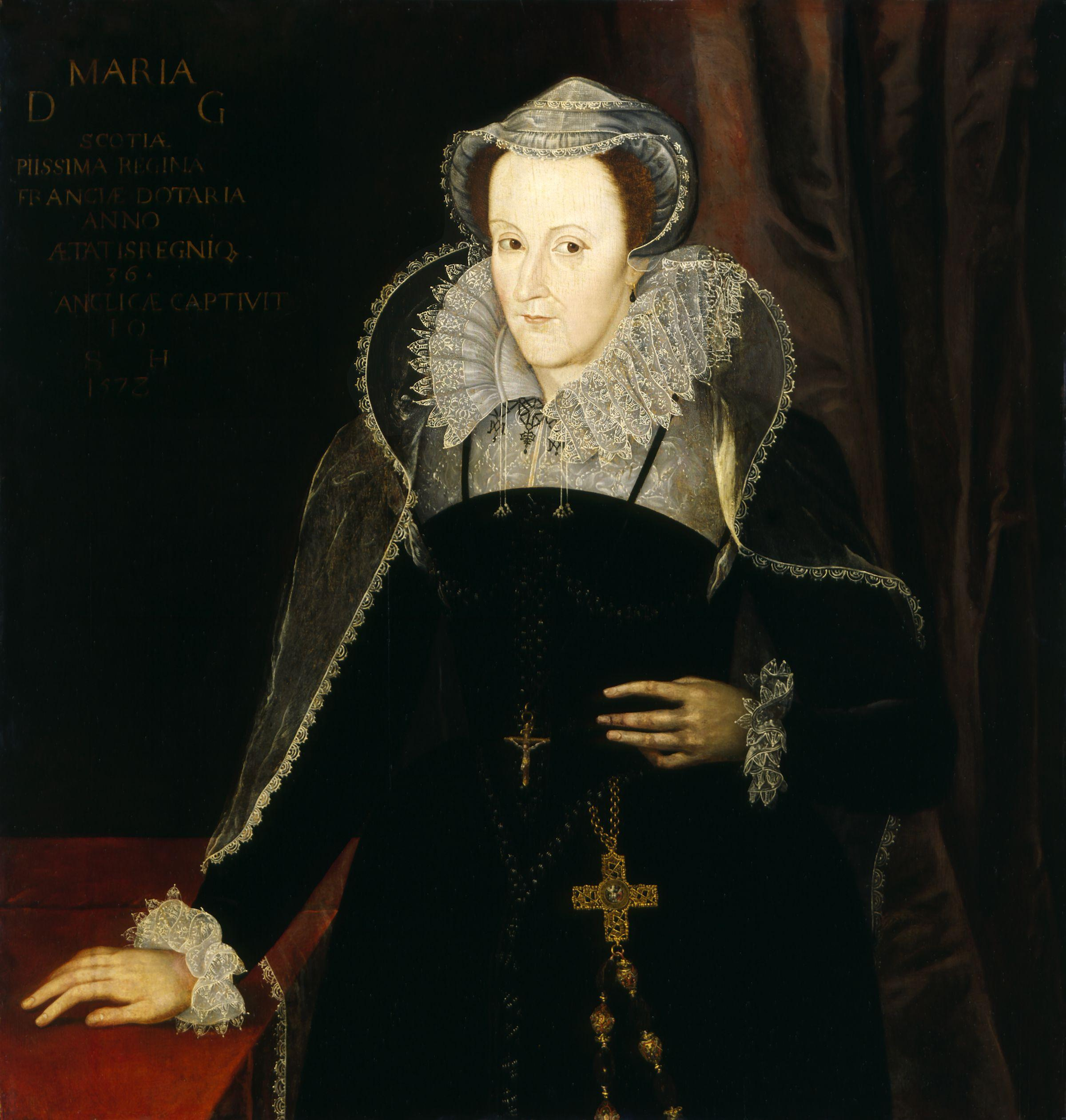
7 – c. 1578

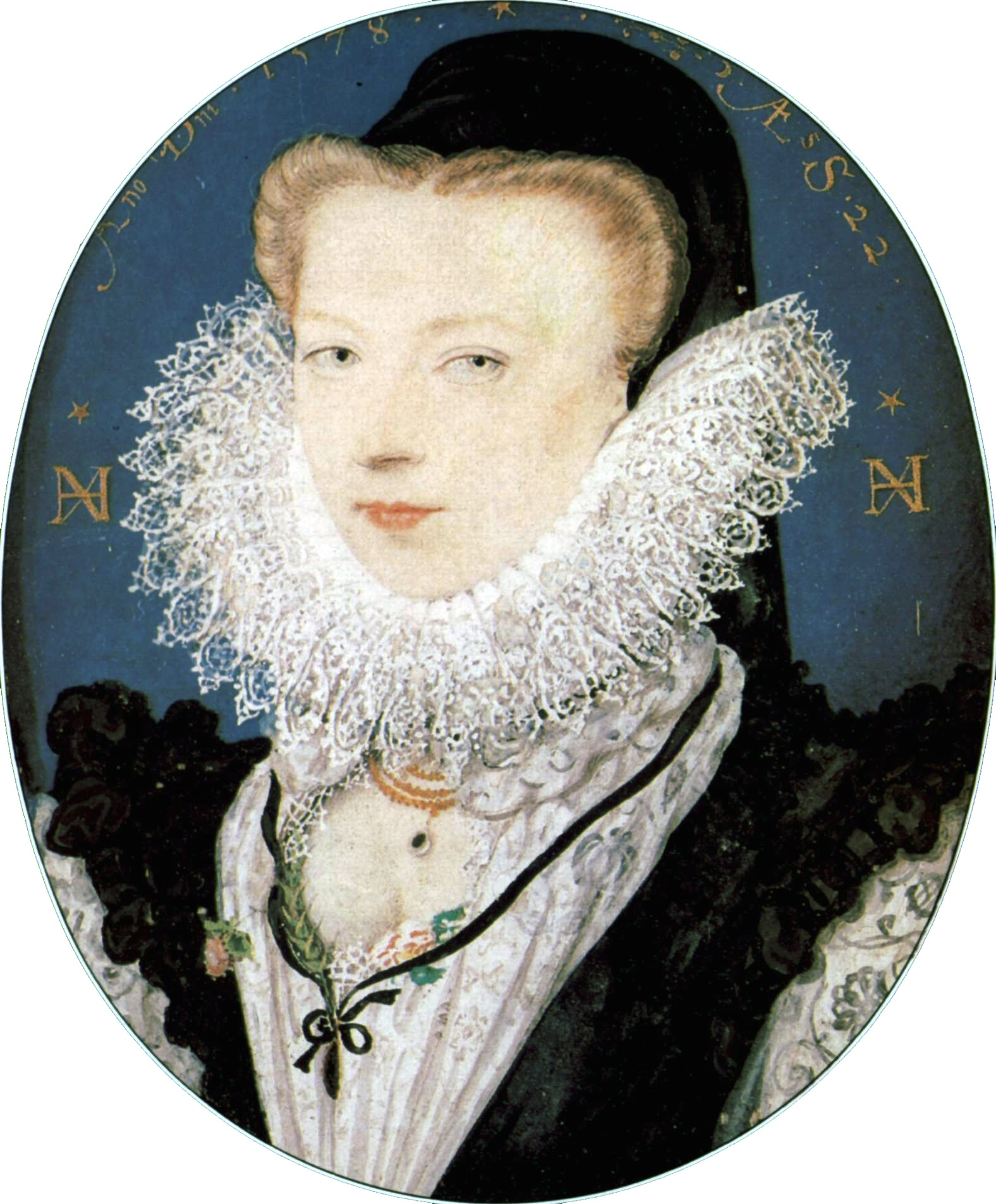
8 – 1578

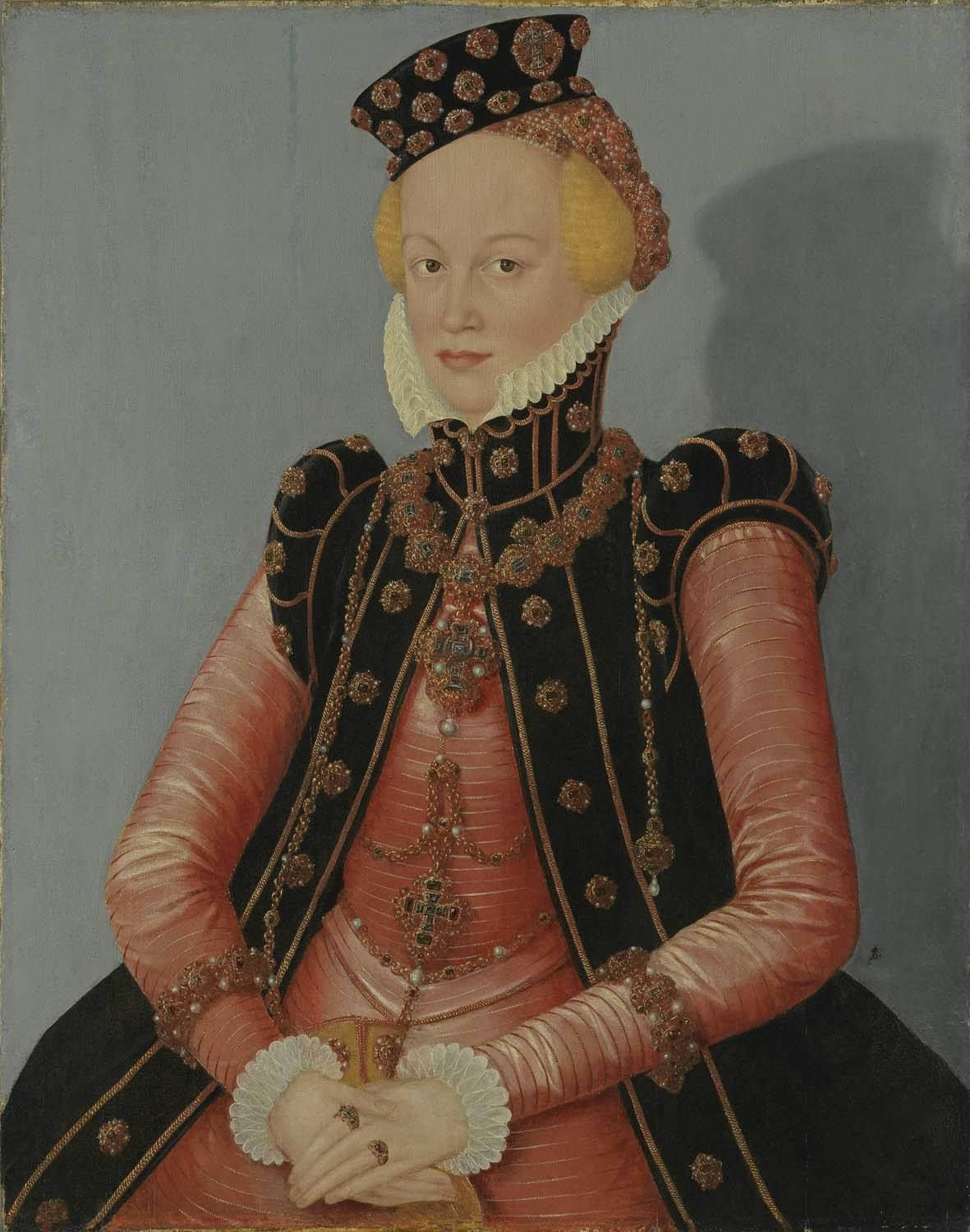
9 – 1579
1. Horizontal lacing over a stomacher and an open chemise are characteristic of Venetian fashion. The skirt is gathered at the waist.
2. Consort of Spain, Anna of Austria by Alonso Sánchez Coello wearing Spanish fashion, 1571.
3. Leonora di Toledo of Florence, Italy wears a blue gown with a flared collar and tight undersleeves with horizontal trim. The uncorseted S-shaped figure is clearly shown, 1571.
4. Elizabeth of Austria is portrayed by the French court painter François Clouet in a brocade gown and a partlet with a lattice of jewels, 1571. The lattice partlet is a common French fashion.
5. In this allegorical painting c. 1572, Elizabeth I wears a fitted gown with hanging sleeves over a matching arched bodice and skirt or petticoat, elaborate undersleeves, and a high-necked chemise with a ruff. Her skirt fits smoothly over a Spanish farthingale.
6. Elizabeth I wears a doublet with fringed braid trim that forms button loops and a matching petticoat. Janet Arnold suggests that this method of trimming may be a Polish fashion (similar trimmings à la hussar were worn in the 19th century).
7. Mary, Queen of Scots in captivity wears French fashions: her open ruff fastens at the base of the neck, and her skirt hangs in soft folds over a French farthingale. She wears a cap and veil.
8. Nicholas Hilliard's miniature of his wife Alice shows her wearing an open partlet and a closed ruff. Her blackwork sleeves have a sheer overlayer. She wears a black hood with a veil, 1578.
9. German fashion: Margarethe Elisabeth von Ansbach-Bayreuth wears a tall-collared black gown over a reddish-pink doublet with tight sleeves and a matching petticoat. She wears a black hat.

=== Style gallery 1580s ===
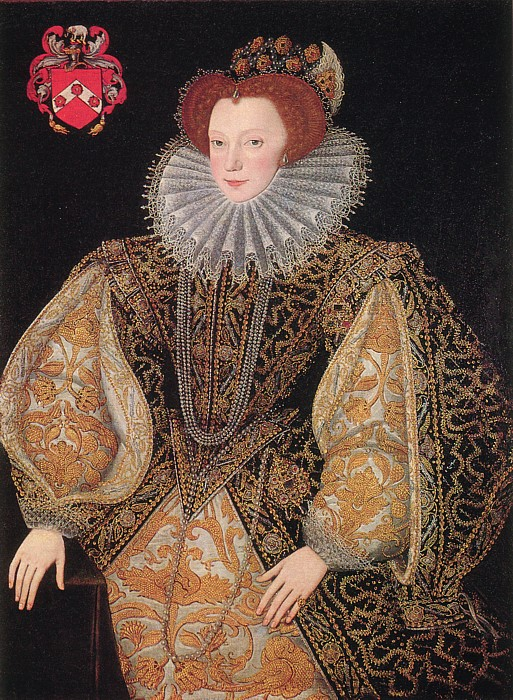
1 – 1580s

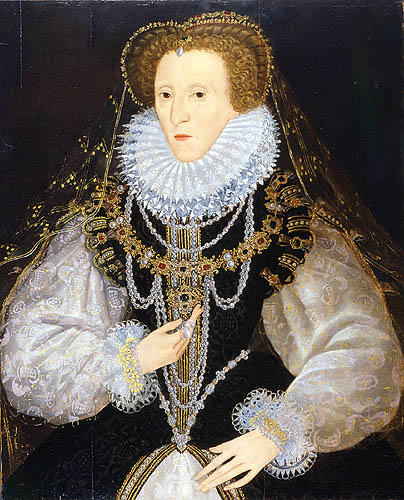
2 – 1580s

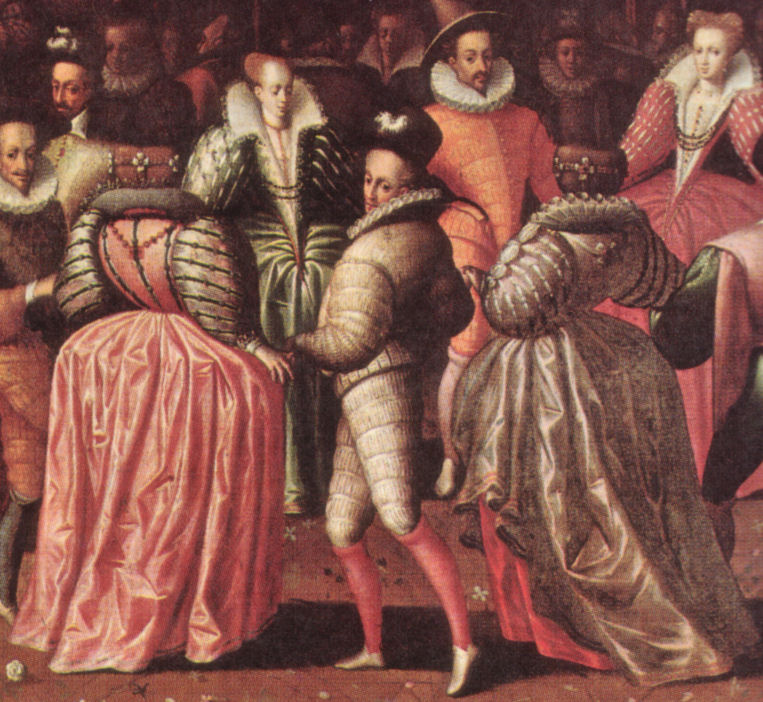
3 – 1580s

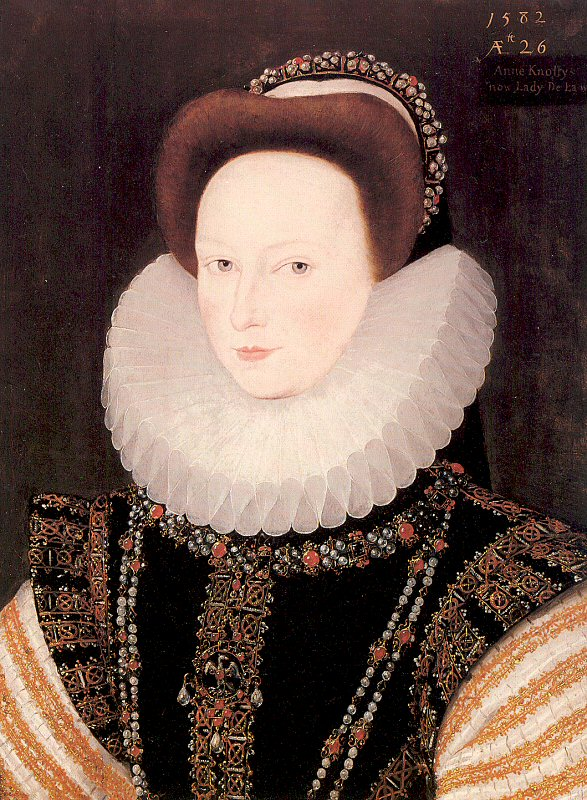
4 – 1582

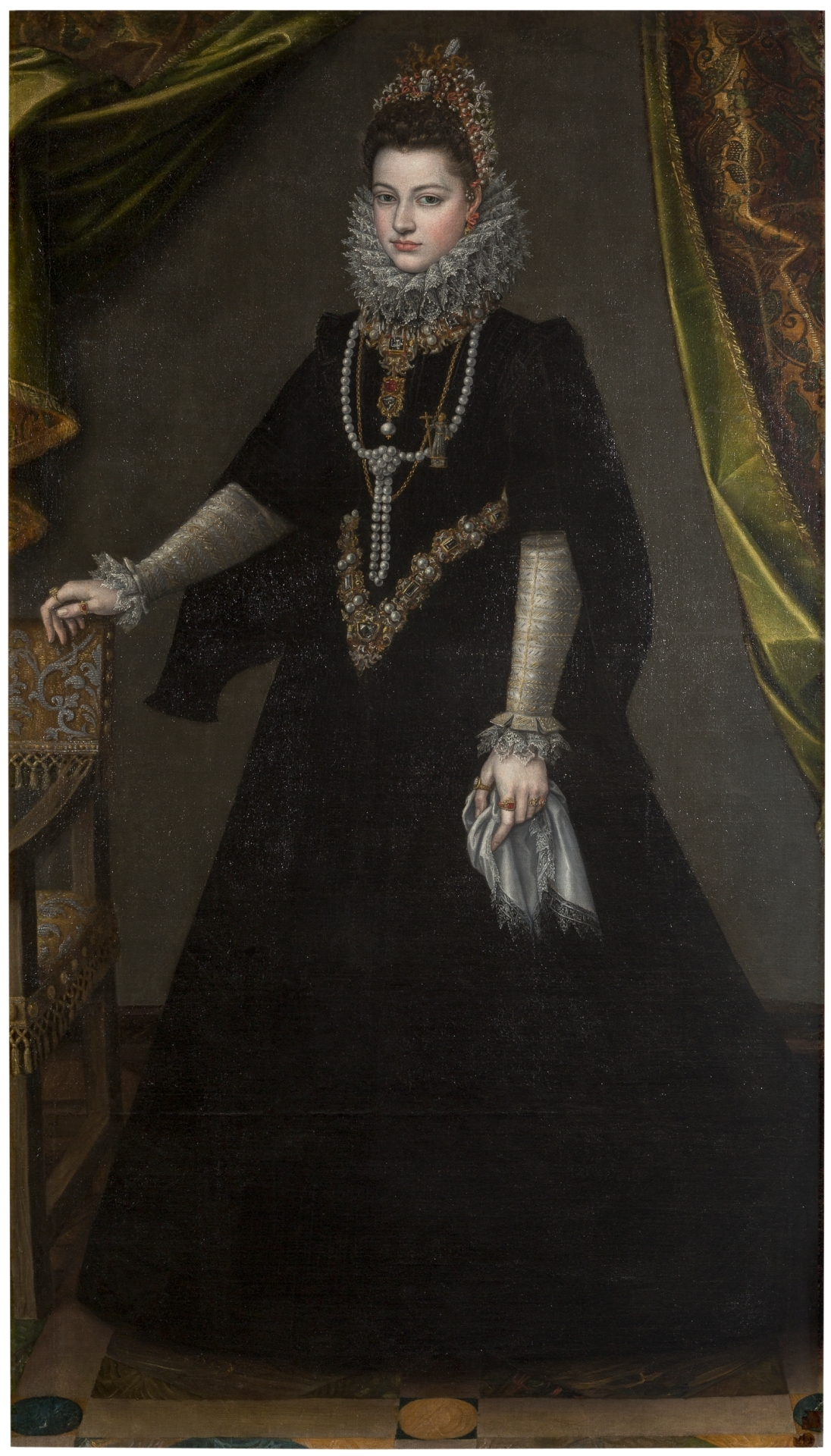
5 – c. 1584

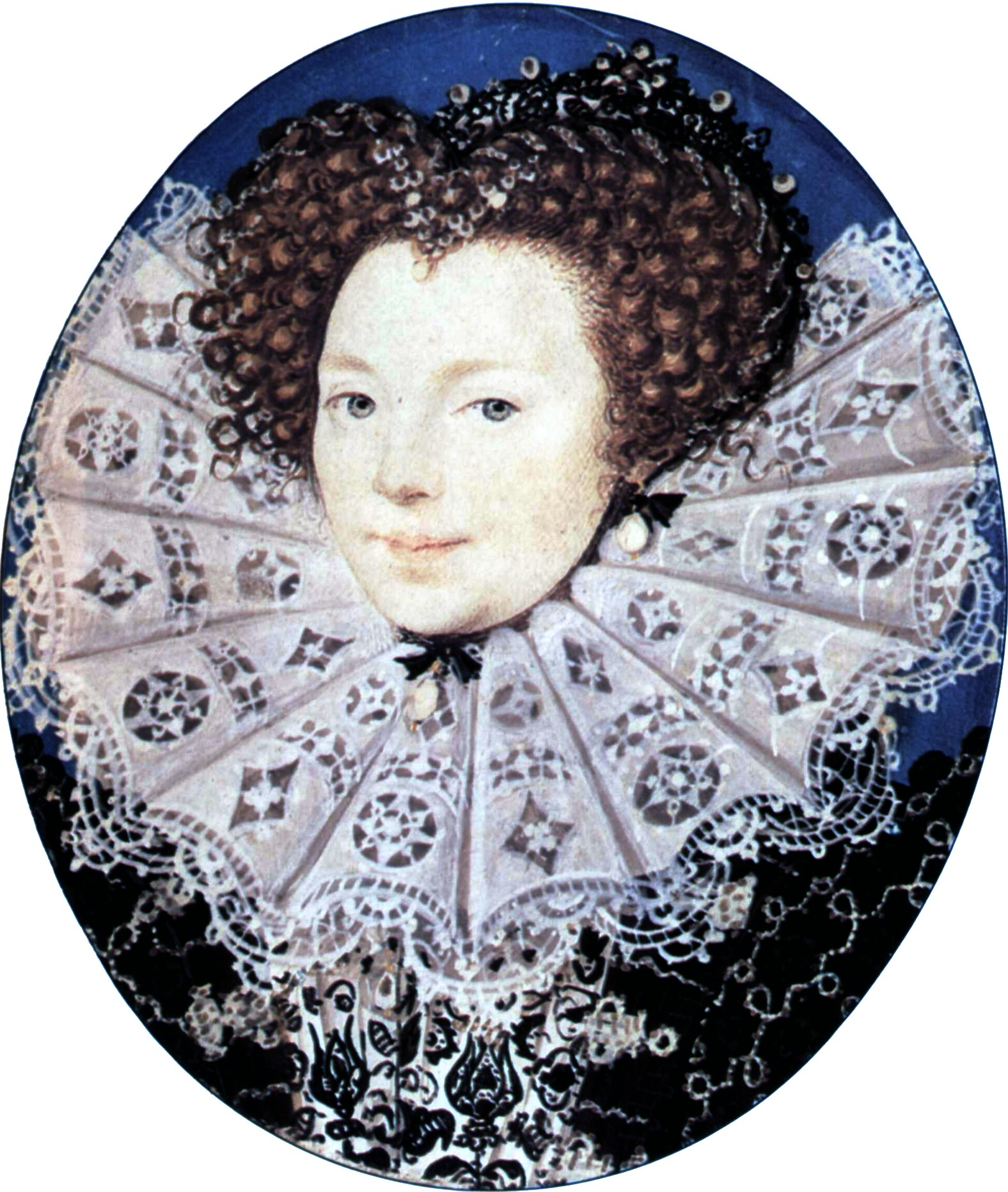
6 – 1585–90

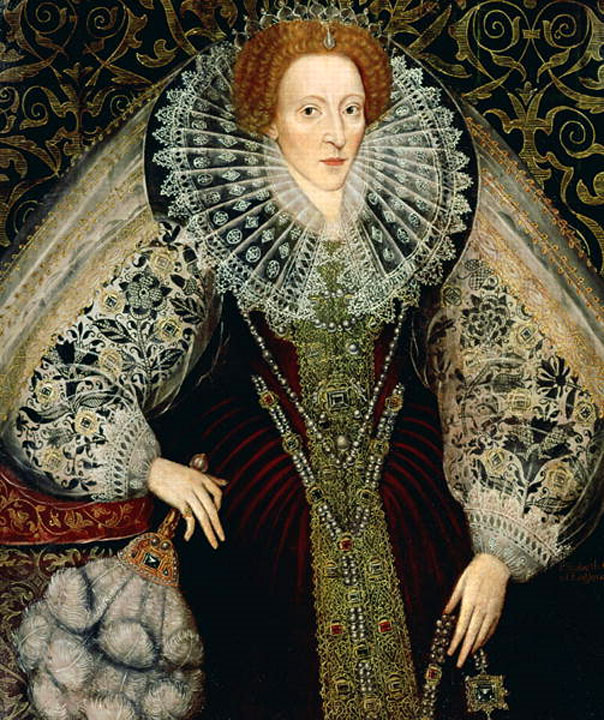
7 – 1585–90

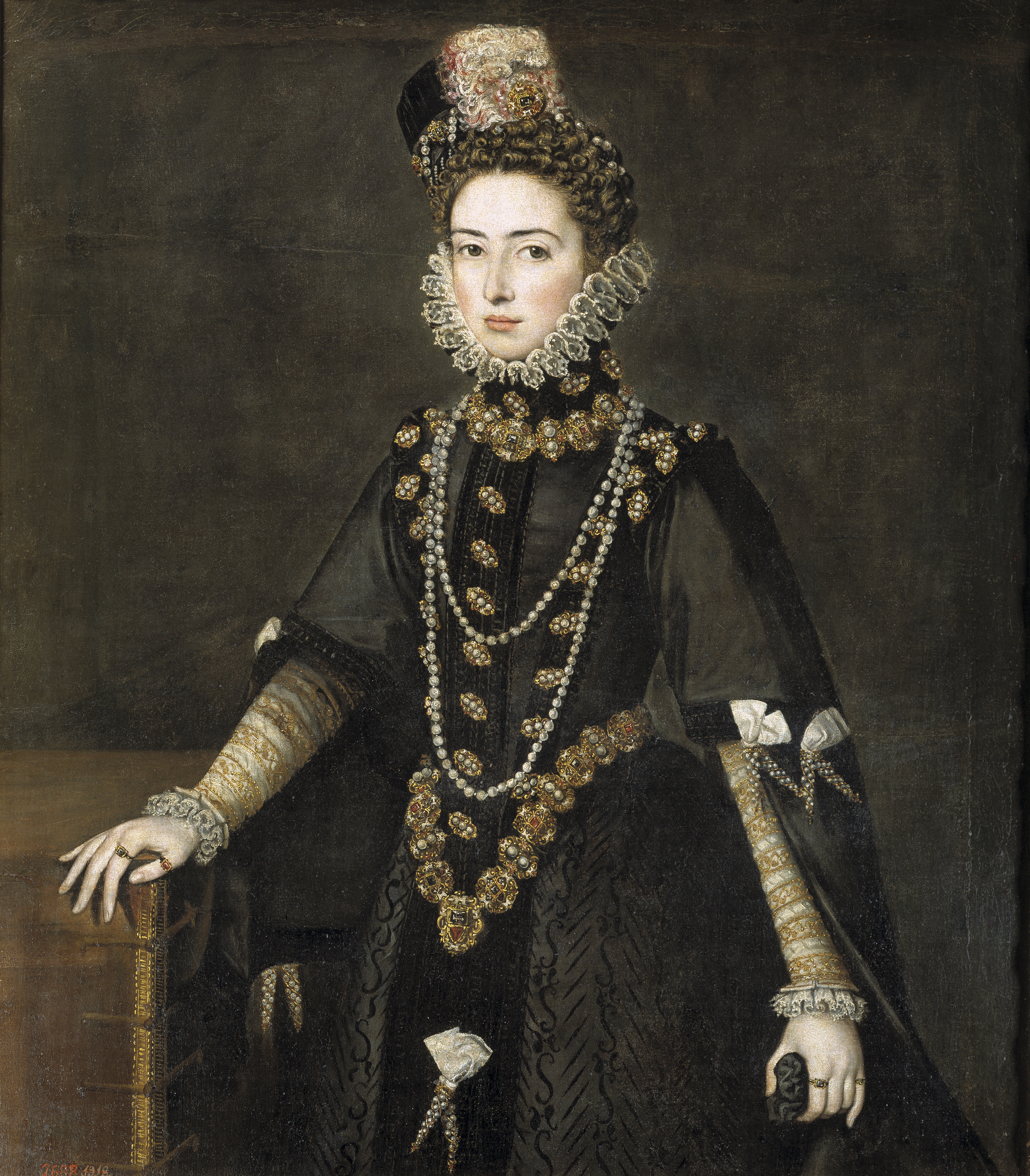
8 – 1585

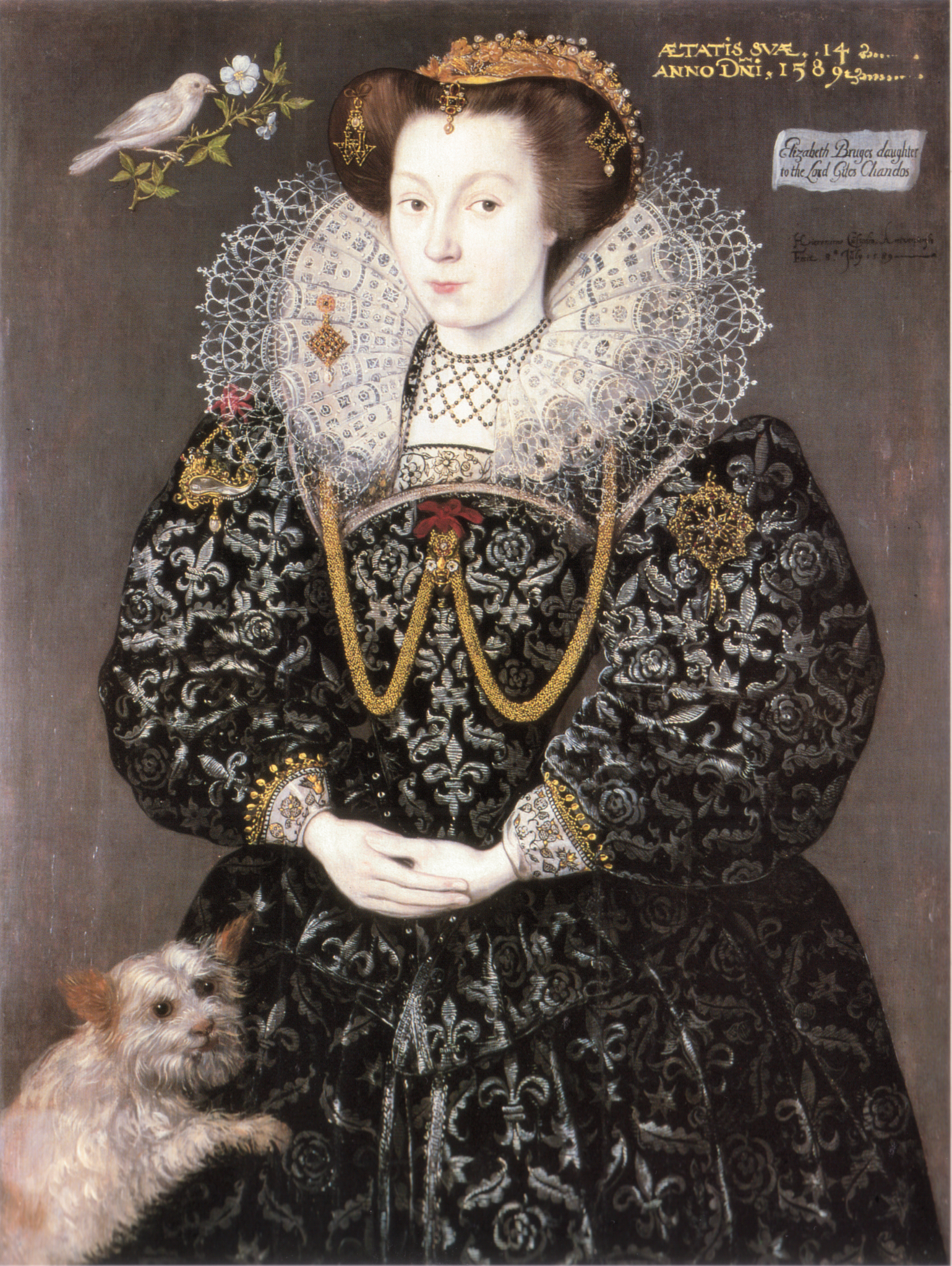
9 – 1589

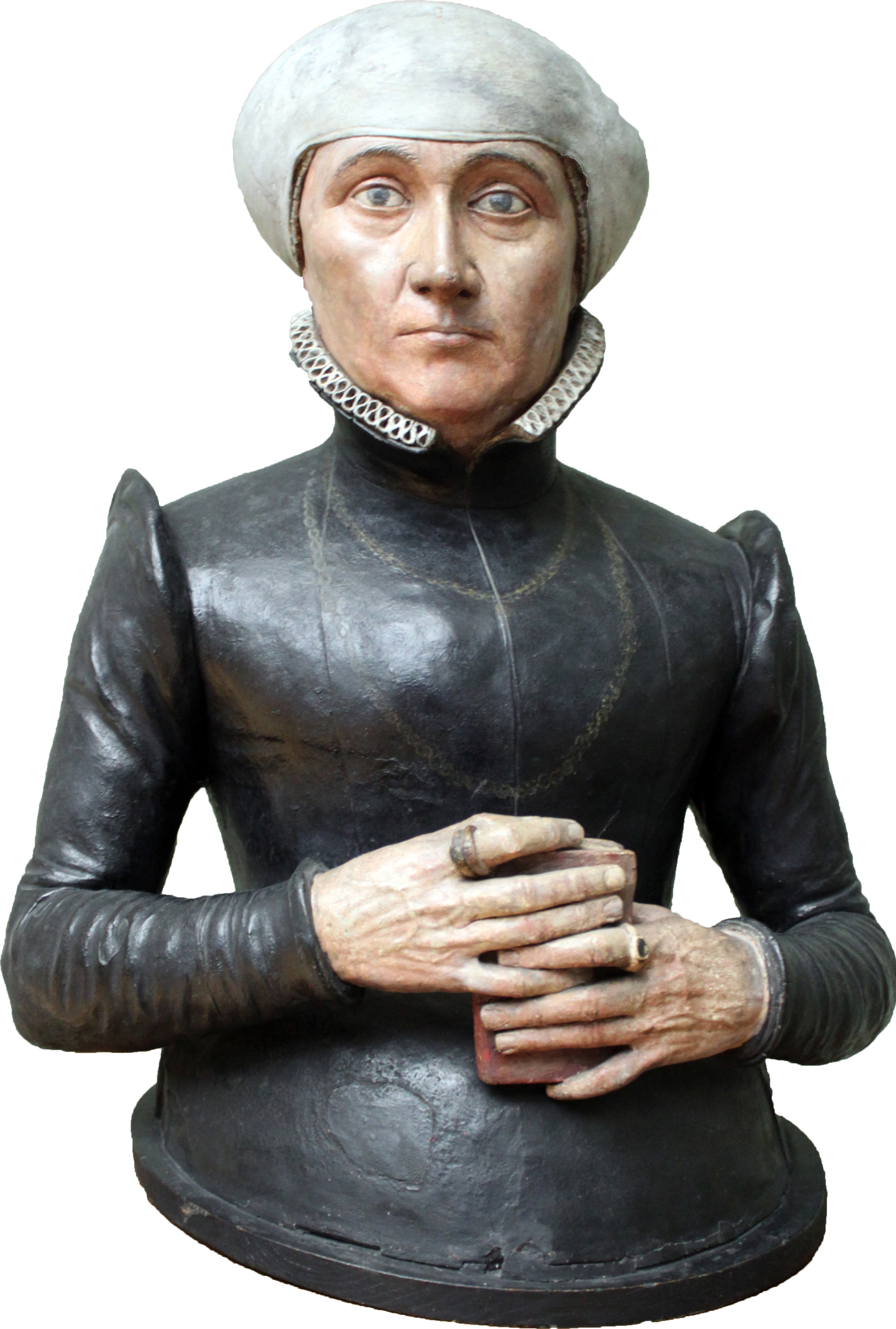
10 – 1580s
1. Lettice Knollys wears an embroidered black high-necked bodice with round sleeves and skirt over a gold petticoat or forepart and matching undersleeves, a lace cartwheel ruff and lace cuffs, and a tall black hat with a jeweled ostrich feather, c. 1580s.
2. Elizabeth I wears a black gown with vertical bands of trim on the bodice. The curved waistline and dropped front opening of the overskirt suggest that she is wearing a French roll to support her skirt. She wears a heart-shaped cap and a sheer veil decorated with a pattern of pearls, early 1580s.
3. Ladies of the French court c. 1580 wear gowns with wide French farthingales, long pointed bodices with revers and open ruffs, and full sleeves. This style appears in England around 1590. Note the fashionable sway-backed posture that goes with the long bodice resting on the farthingale.
4. Anne Knollys wears a black gown and full white sleeves trimmed with gold lace or braid. She wears a French hood with a jewelled biliment and a black veil, 1582.
5. The Infanta Isabella Clara Eugenia of Spain is seen here again wearing a Spanish farthingale, a closed overskirt, and the typically Spanish, long, pointed oversleeves. She is wearing black, a testament to the austere side of the Spanish court, c. 1584.
6. Nicholas Hilliard's Unknown Woman wears a cutwork cartwheel ruff. Her stomacher and wired heart-shaped coif are both decorated with blackwork embroidery, 1585–90.
7. Elizabeth I wears a cartwheel ruff slightly open at the front, supported by a supportasse. Her blackwork sleeves have sheer linen oversleeves, and she wears wired veil with bands of gold lace, 1585–90.
8. Infanta Catalina Micaela of Spain wears an entirely black gown with lace collar and cuffs, with white inner sleeves trimmed with gold embroidery or applied braid. Her jewellery includes a double string of pearls, a necklace, worked golden buttons and a belt.
9. Elizabeth Brydges, aged 14, wears a black brocade gown over a French farthingale. The blackwork embroidery on her smock is visible above the arch of her bodice; her cuffs are also trimmed with blackwork. This style is uniquely English. She wears an open-fronted cartwheel ruff.
10. Anna Imhoff, wears a black bodice with pointed shoulder pads, a high collar with a ruff. A coif covers her hair.

=== Style gallery 1590s ===
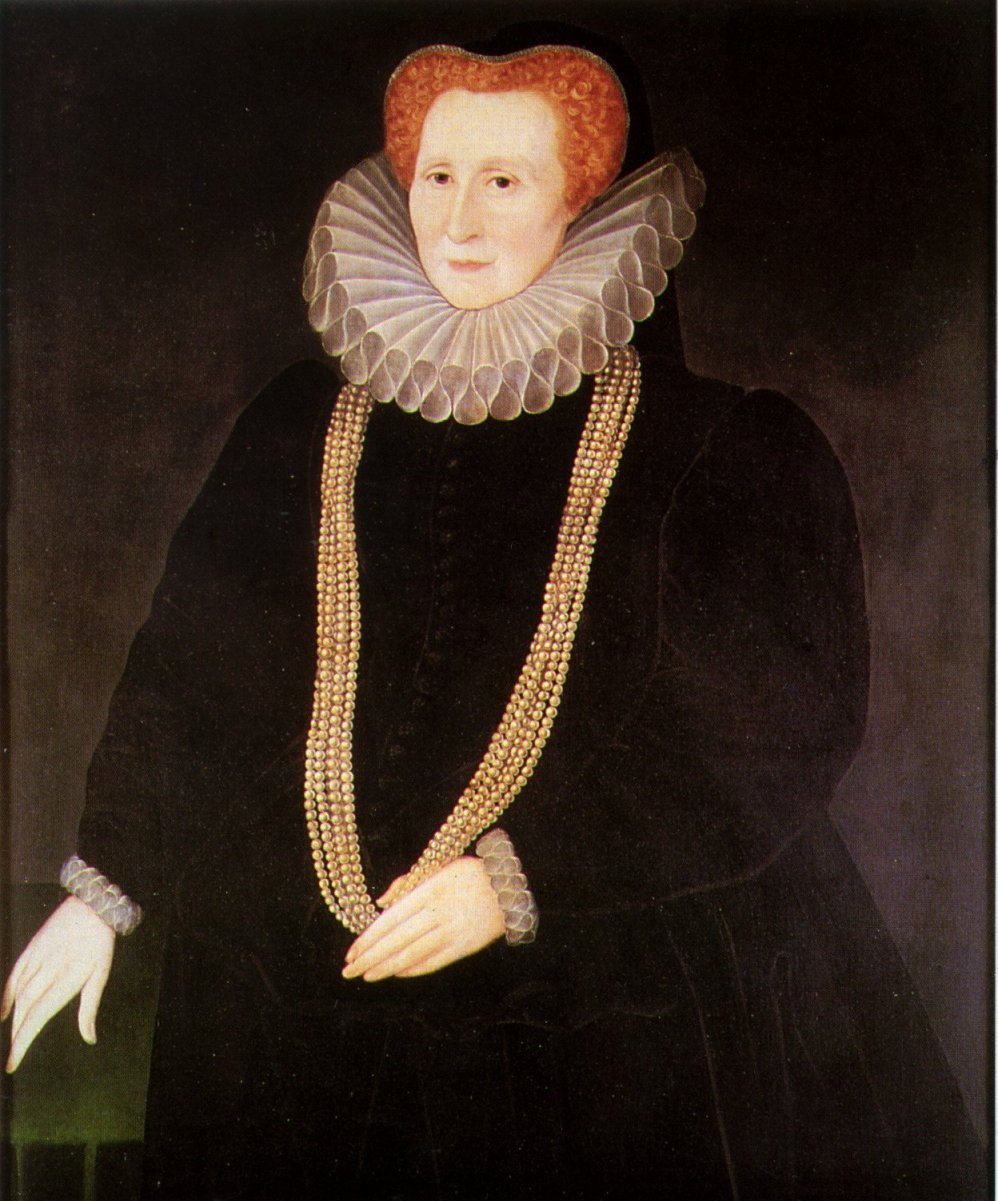
1 – 1592

2 – 1592

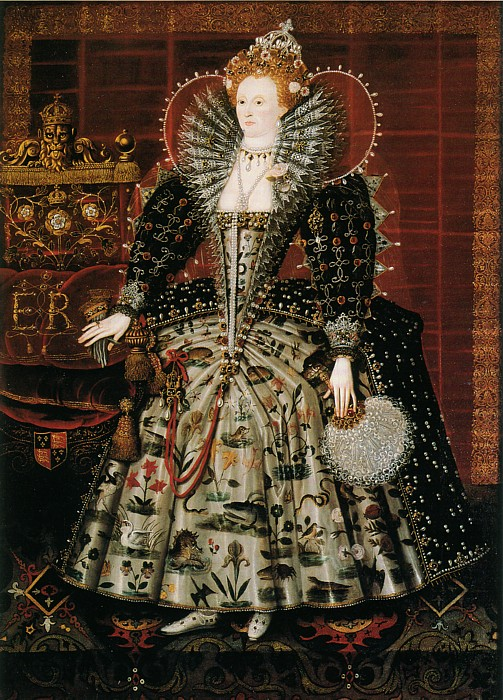
3 – 1592

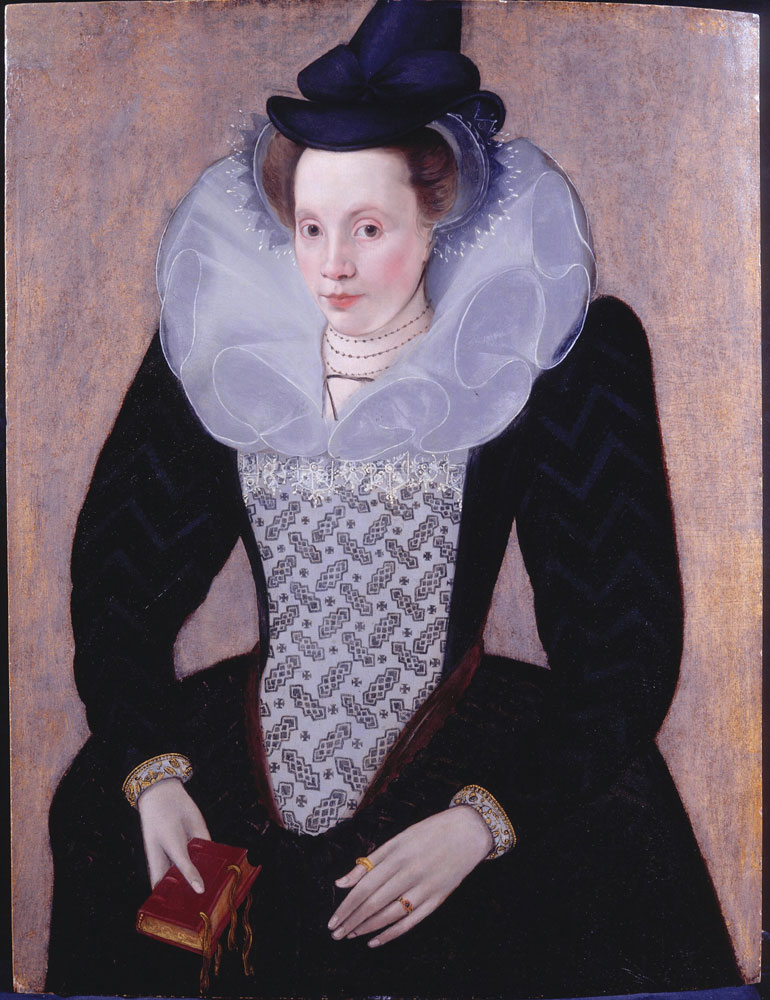
4 – c. 1592

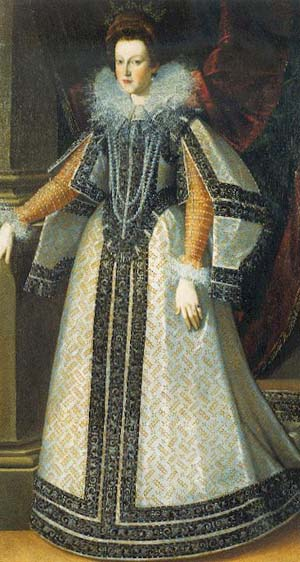
5 – 1593–95

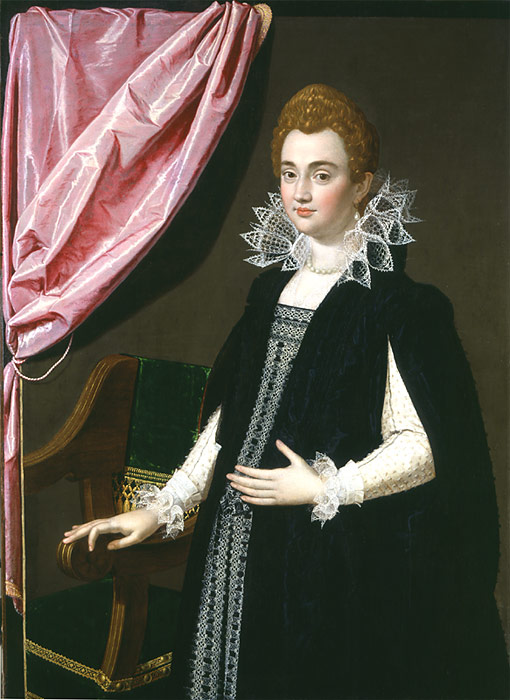
6 – 1594

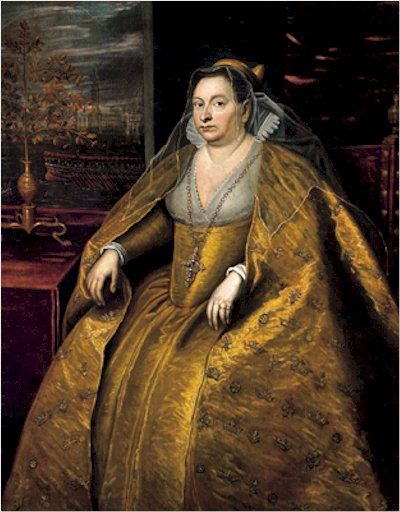
7 – 1590s

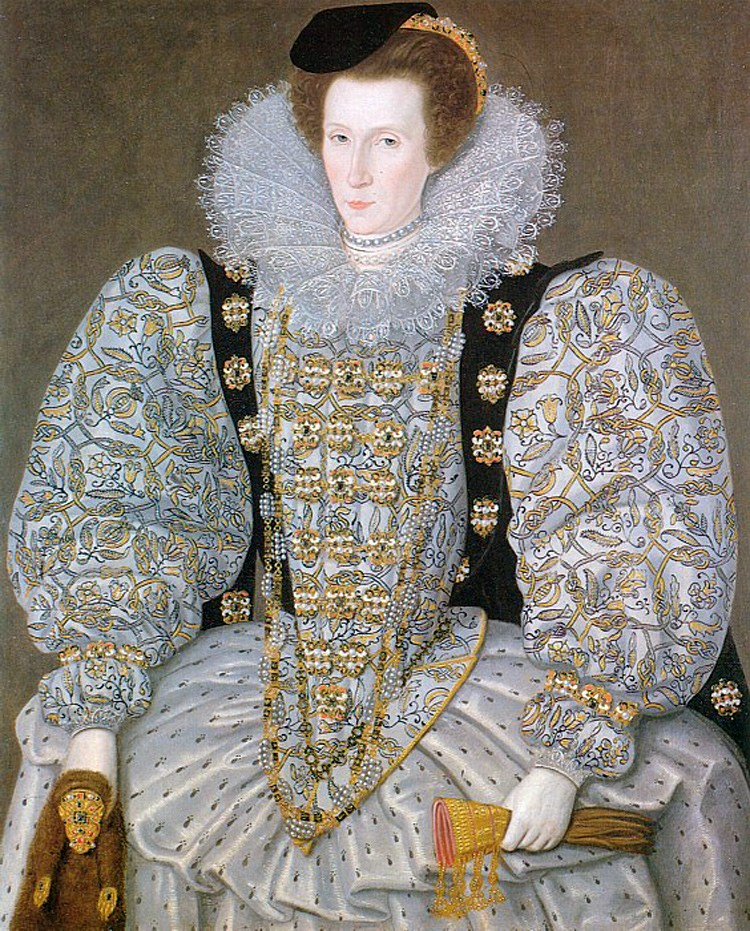
8 – c. 1595
1. The widowed Bess of Hardwick, Countess of Shrewsbury, wears a black gown and cap with a linen ruff, 1590.
2. Elizabeth I, 1592, wears a dark red gown (the fabric is just visible at the waist under her arms) with hanging sleeves lined in white satin to match her bodice, undersleeves, and petticoat, which is pinned to a cartwheel farthingale. She carries leather gloves and an early folding fan.
3. Elizabeth I wears a painted petticoat with her black gown and cartwheel farthingale. She wears an open lace ruff and a sheer, wired veil frames her head and shoulders. Her skirt is ankle-length and shows her shoes, 1592.
4. English woman wears a fashion seen in many formal portraits of Puritan women in the 1590s, characterized by a black gown worn with a blackwork stomacher and a small French farthingale or half-roll, with a fine linen ruff and moderate use of lace and other trim. She wears a tall black hat called a capotain over a sheer linen cap and simple jewelry.
5. Italian style: Maria de Medici wears a bodice with split, round hanging sleeves. Her tight undersleeves are characteristic of Spanish influence. From the folds of her skirt, she appears to be wearing a small roll over a narrow Spanish farthingale. Note that her oversleeves are the same shape as those worn by Lettice Knollys.
6. This portrait (assumed to be Maria de Medici) shows the adaptation of fashion to accommodate pregnancy. A loose dark gown is worn over a matching bodice and skirt, with tight white undersleeves. The lady wears an open figure-of-eight ruff of reticella lace, 1594.
7. Italian fashion of the 1590s featured bodices cut below the breasts and terminating in a blunt U-shape at the front waist, worn over open high-necked chemises with ruffled collars that frame the head. The Dogaressa of Venice wears a cloth of gold gown and matching cape and a sheer veil over a small cap, 1590s.
8. Unknown English lady, formerly called Elizabeth I, wears a black gown over a white bodice and sleeves embroidered in black and gold, and a spotted white petticoat. Her hood is draped over her forehead in a style called a bongrace, and she carries a zibellino or flea-fur, with a jeweled face, 1595.

== Men's fashion ==
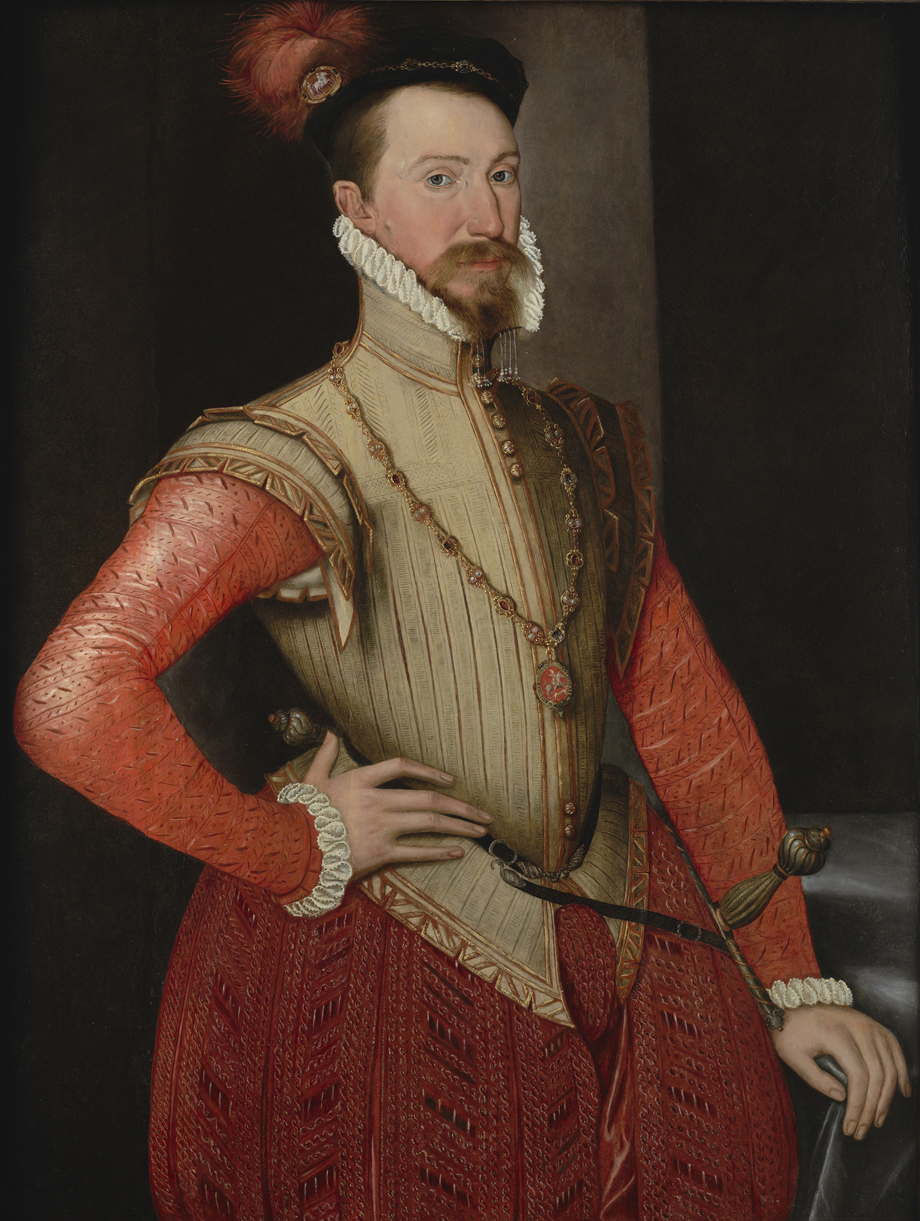
Robert Dudley, Earl of Leicester in the narrow fashions of the 1560s: Ruff, doublet, slashed leather jerkin, and paned trunk hose with codpiece.

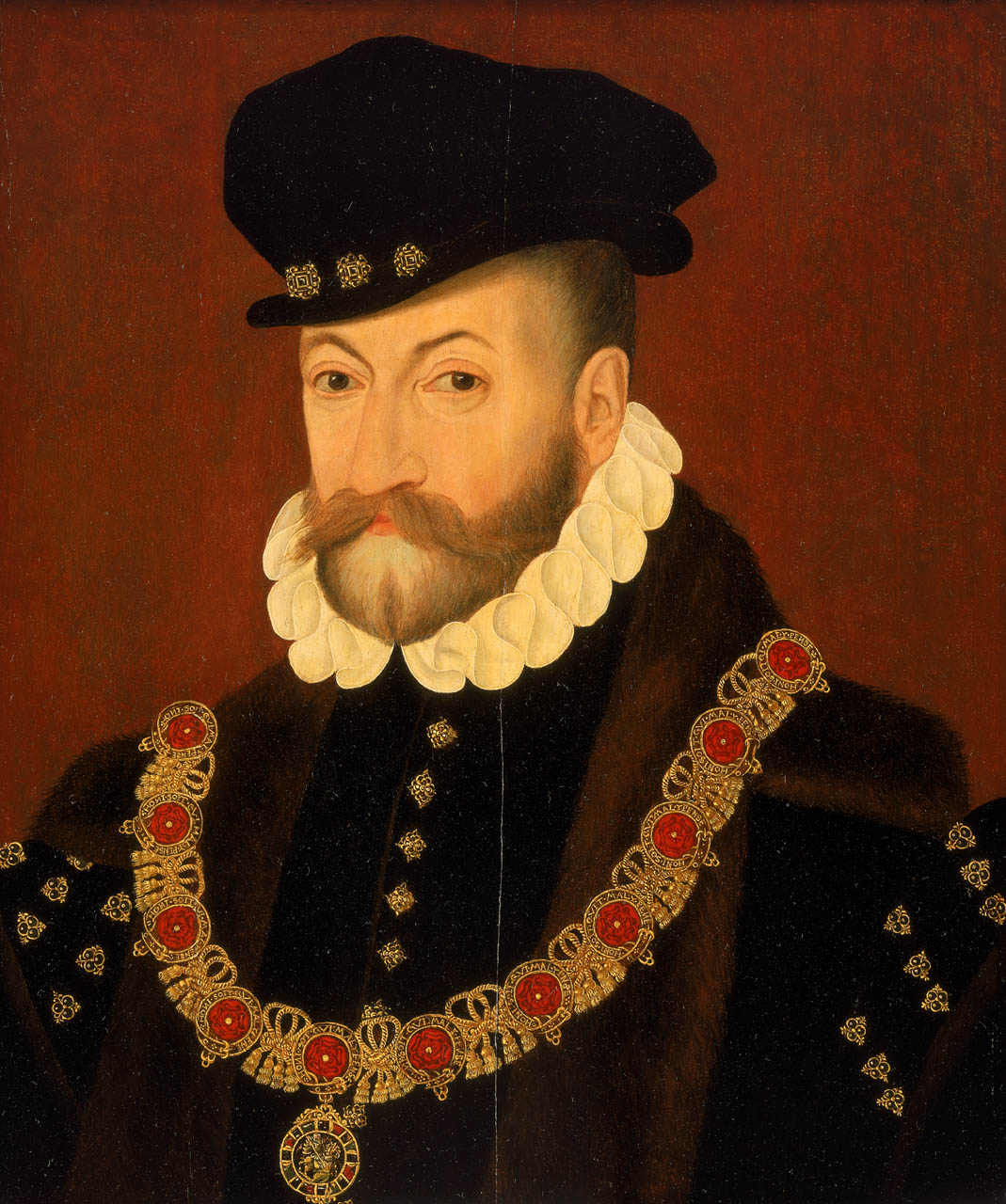
The Earl of Lincoln wears a stiffened, gathered hat with a jeweled band. He wears the livery collar of the Order of the Garter c. 1575.

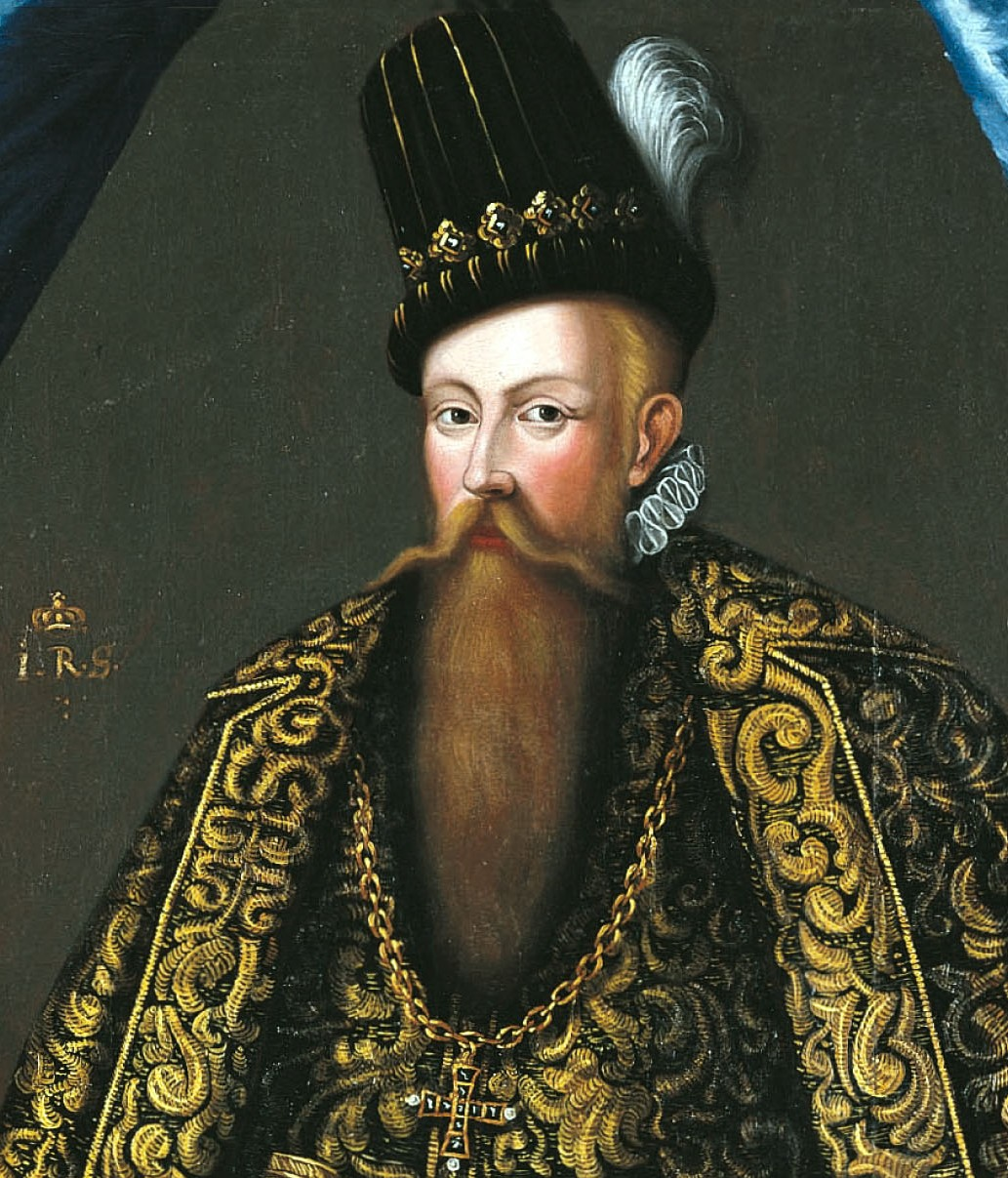
King John III of Sweden wears an embroidered cape with a collar over his doublet c. 1580.

=== Overview ===
Men's fashionable clothing consisted of a linen shirt with collar or ruff and matching wrist ruffs, which were laundered with starch to be kept stiff and bright. Over the shirt men wore a doublet with long sleeves sewn or laced in place. Doublets were stiff, heavy garments, and were often reinforced with boning. Optionally, a jerkin, usually sleeveless and often made of leather, was worn over the doublet. During this time the doublet and jerkin became increasingly more colorful and highly decorated. Waistlines dipped V-shape in front, and were padded to hold their shape. Around 1570, this padding was exaggerated into a peascod belly.

Hose, in variety of styles, were worn with a codpiece early in the period. Trunk hose or round hose were short padded hose. Very short trunk hose were worn over cannions, fitted hose that ended above the knee. Trunk hose could be paned or pansied, with strips of fabric (panes) over a full inner layer or lining. Slops or galligaskins were loose hose reaching just below the knee. Slops could also be pansied.

Pluderhosen were a Northern European form of pansied slops with a very full inner layer pulled out between the panes and hanging below the knee.

Venetians were semi-fitted hose reaching just below the knee.

Men wore stockings or netherstocks and flat shoes with rounded toes, with slashes early in the period and ties over the instep later. Boots were worn for riding.

=== Outerwear ===
Short cloaks or capes, usually hip-length, often with sleeves, or a military jacket like a mandilion, were fashionable. Long cloaks were worn in cold and wet weather. Gowns were increasingly old-fashioned, and were worn by older men for warmth indoors and out. In this period robes began their transition from general garments to traditional clothing of specific occupations, such as scholars (see Academic dress).

=== Hairstyles and headgear ===
Hair was generally worn short, brushed back from the forehead. Longer styles were popular in the 1580s. In the 1590s, young men of fashion wore a lovelock, a long section of hair hanging over one shoulder.

Through the 1570s, a soft fabric hat with a gathered crown was worn. These derived from the flat hat of the previous period, and over time the hat was stiffened and the crown became taller and far from flat. Later, a conical felt hat with a rounded crown called a capotain or copotain became fashionable. These became very tall toward the end of century. Hats were decorated with a jewel or feather, and were worn indoors and out.

Close-fitting caps covering the ears and tied under the chin called coifs continued to be worn by children and older men under their hats or alone indoors; men's coifs were usually black.

A conical cap of linen with a turned up brim called a nightcap was worn informally indoors; these were often embroidered.

=== Beards ===
Although beards were worn by many men prior to the mid-16th century, it was at this time when grooming and styling facial hair gained social significance. These styles would change very frequently, from pointed whiskers to round trims, throughout these few decades. The easiest way men were able to maintain the style of their beards was to apply starch onto their groomed faces. The most popular styles of beards at this time include:

- The Cadiz Beard or Cads Beard, which was named after the Cádiz Expedition in 1596. It resembles a large and discussed growth upon the chin.
- The Goat Beard resembles a goatee. It is also very similar to the 'Pick-a-devant and the Barbula style of beards.
- The Peak was, at the time, a common name for the beard, but it referred specifically to a mustache finely groomed to a pointed tip.
- The Pencil Beard is a small portion of the beard easing to a point around the centre of the chin.
- The Stiletto Beard is shaped similarly to the dagger in which it obtained its name.
- The Round Beard, just as its name suggests, is trimmed to add emphasis to the roundness of the male cheekbones. Another common name for this style was the Bush Beard.
- The Spade Beard derives from the design of a spade which belongs in a deck of playing cards. The beard is broad on the higher part of the cheeks which then curves at each side to meet at the tip of the chin. This style was thought to give a martial appearance and was favoured by soldiers.
- The Marquisetto; a very sleek trim of the beard in which is cuts close to the chin.
- The Swallow's Tail Beard is unique in a sense that it entails the groomer to take the hairs from the centre of the chin and separate the hairs toward opposite directions. This is very common variation of the forked beard, although it is greater in length and it is more noticeably spread apart.

=== Accessories ===
A baldrick or "corse" was a belt commonly worn diagonally across the chest or around the waist for holding items such as swords, daggers, bugles, and horns.

Gloves were often used as a social mediator to recognize the wealthy. Beginning in the second half of the 16th century, many men had trimmed tips off of the fingers of gloves in order for the admirer to see the jewels that were being hidden by the glove.

Late in the period, fashionable young men wore a plain gold ring, a jewelled earring, or a strand of black silk through one pierced ear.

=== Style gallery 1550s–1560s ===
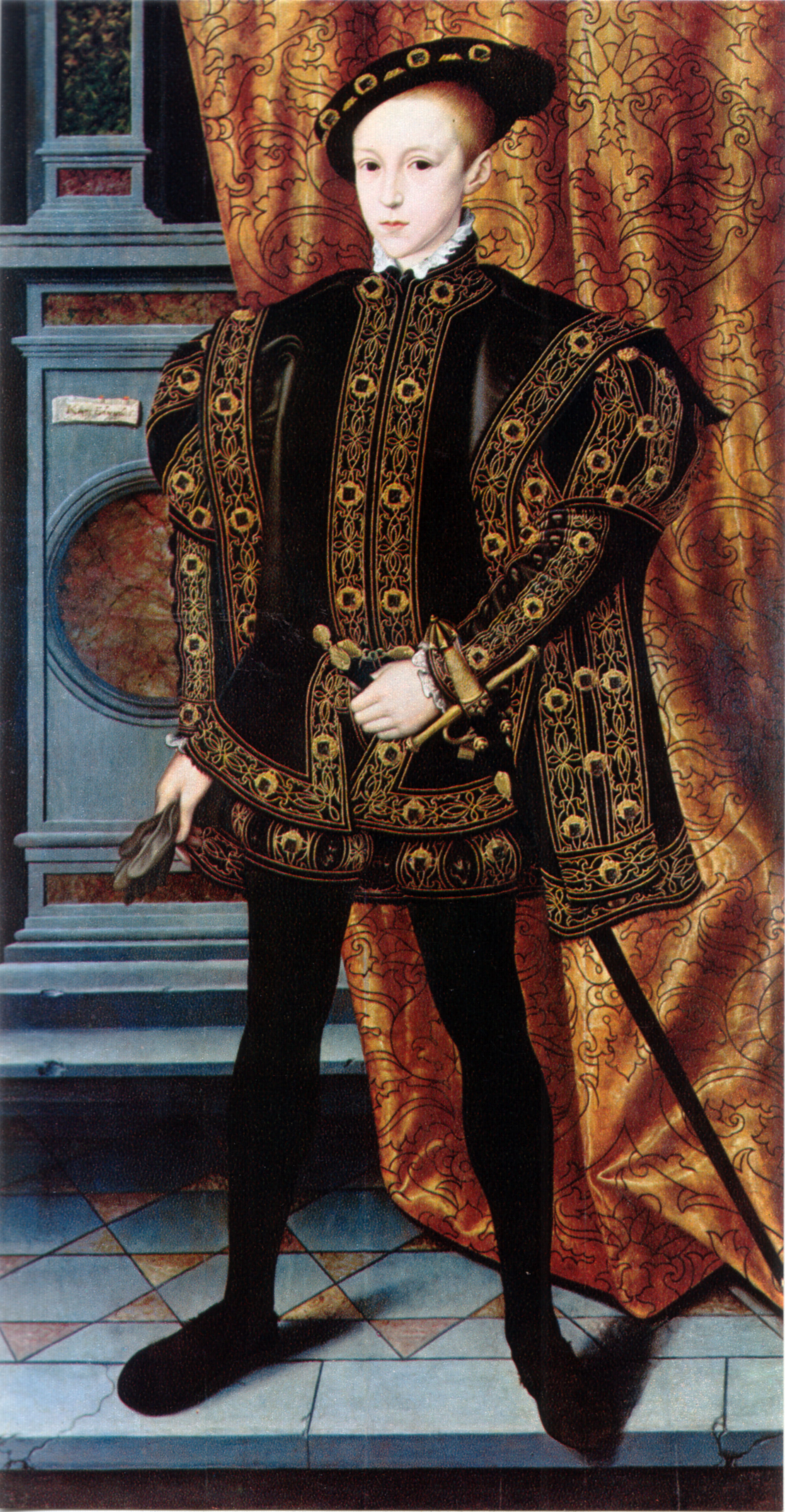
1 – c. 1550

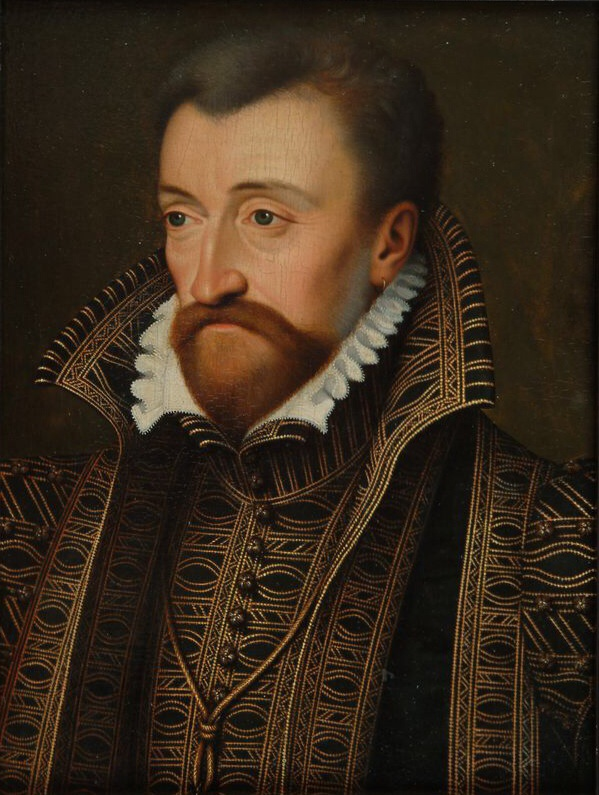
2 – 1557

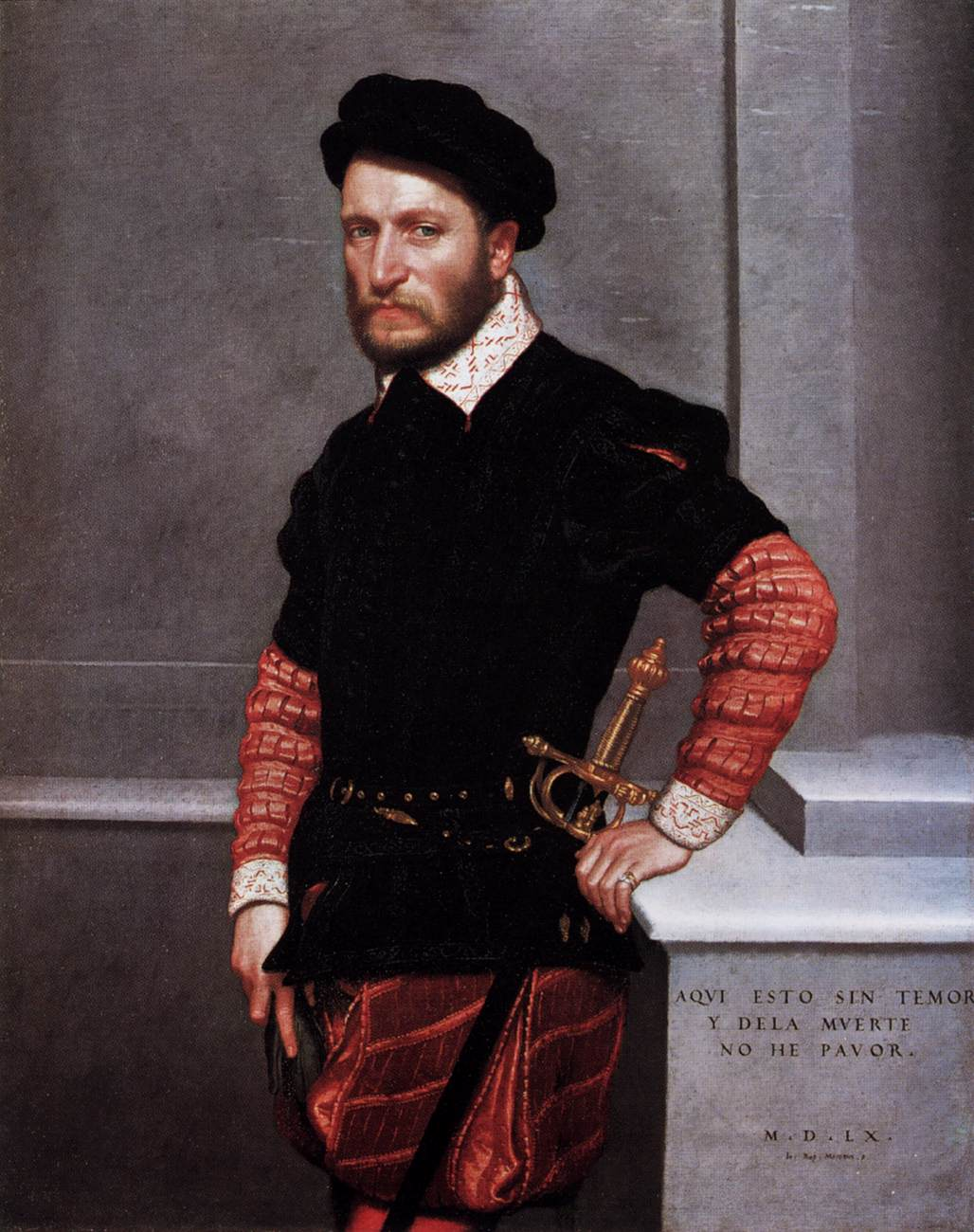
3 – 1560

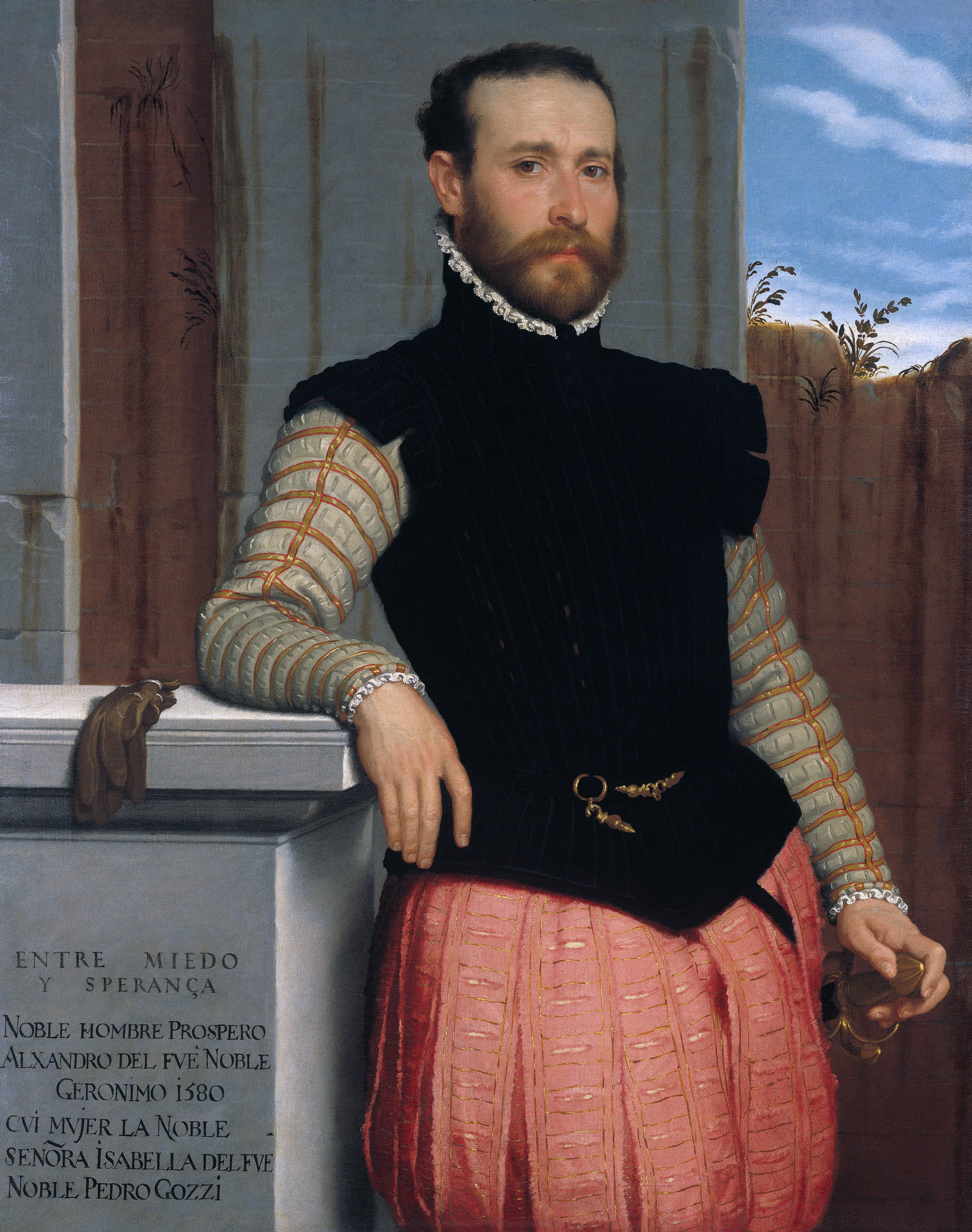
4 – 1560

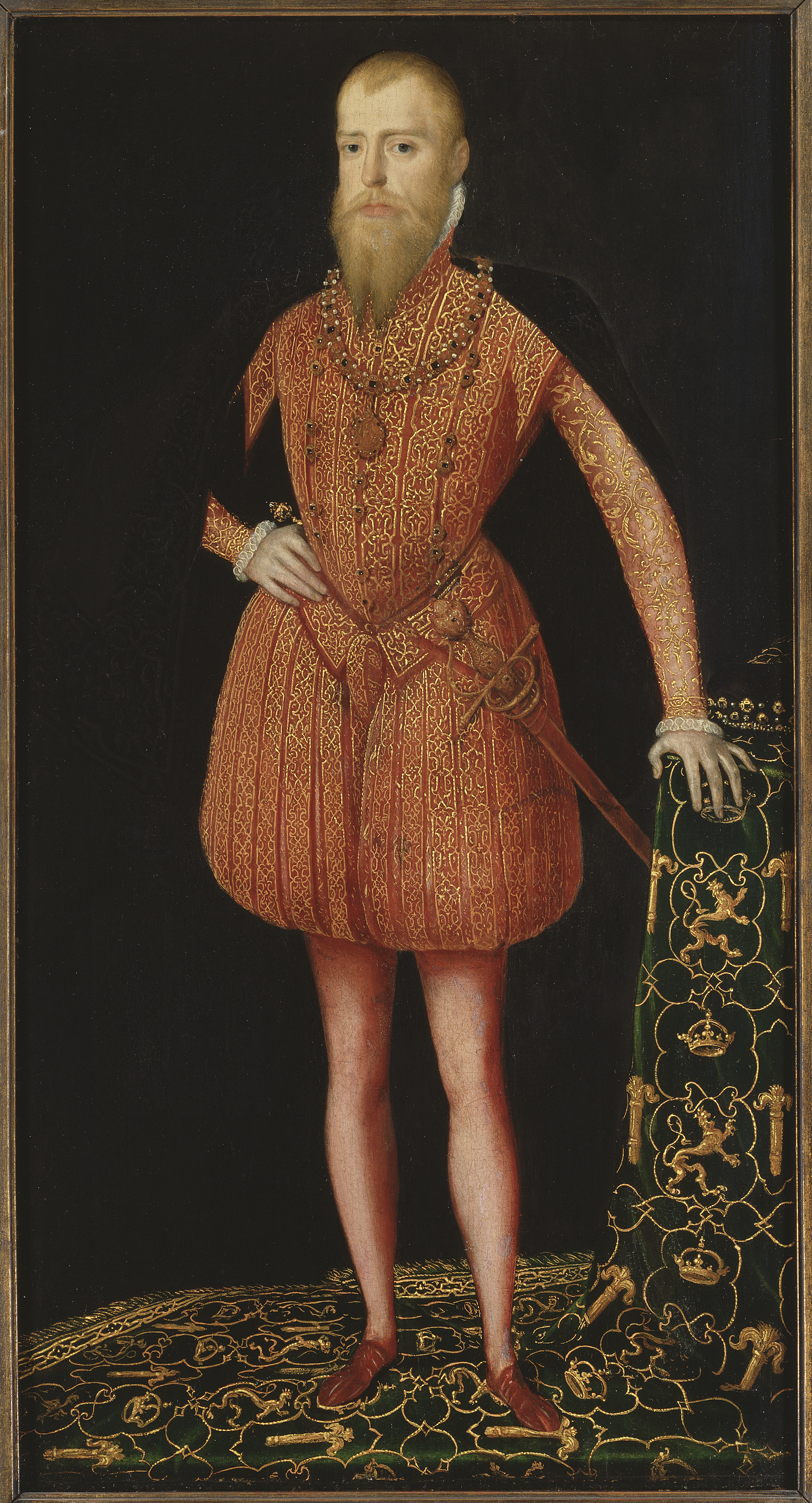
5 – c. 1560

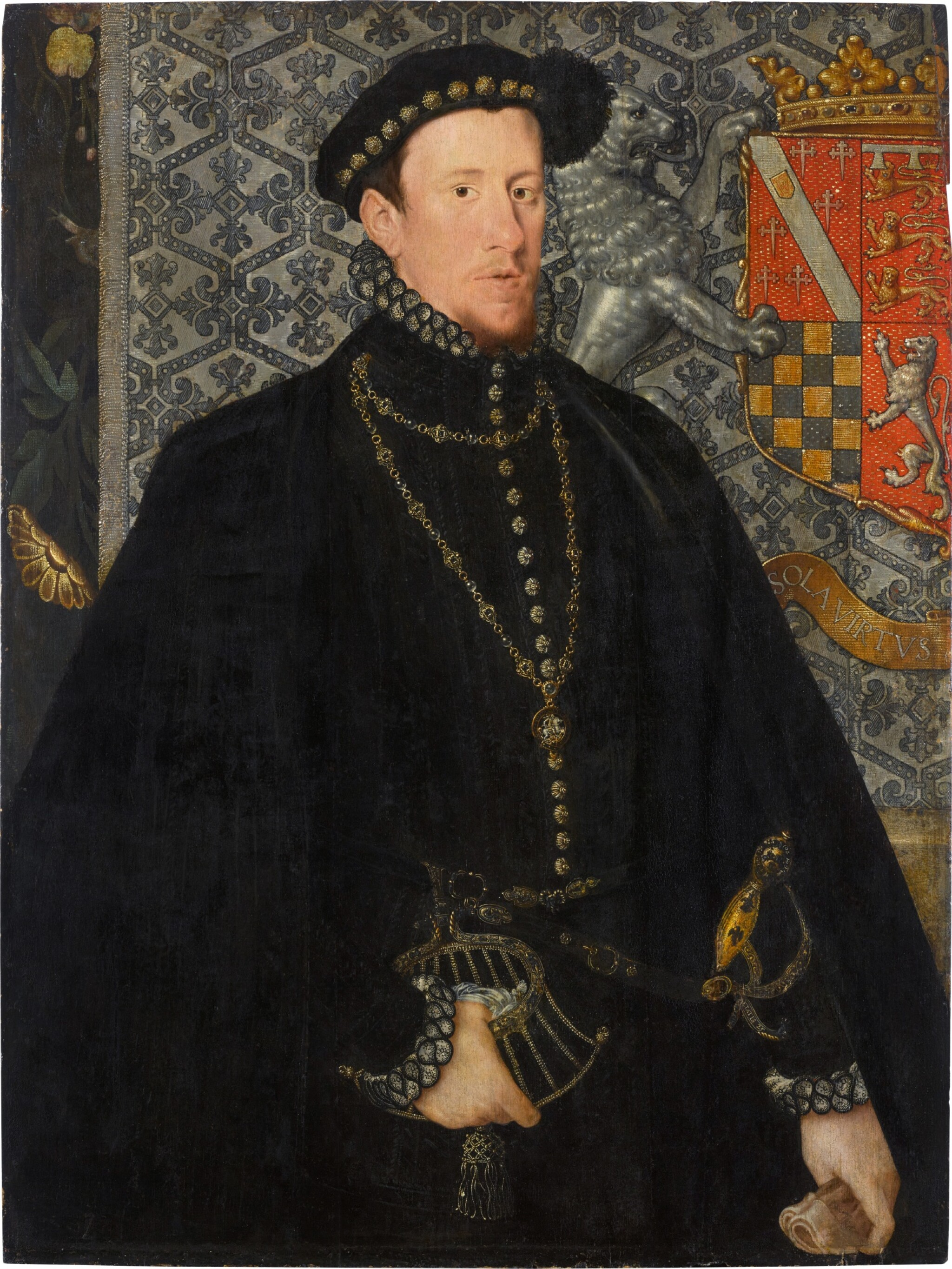
6 – 1563

7 – 1566

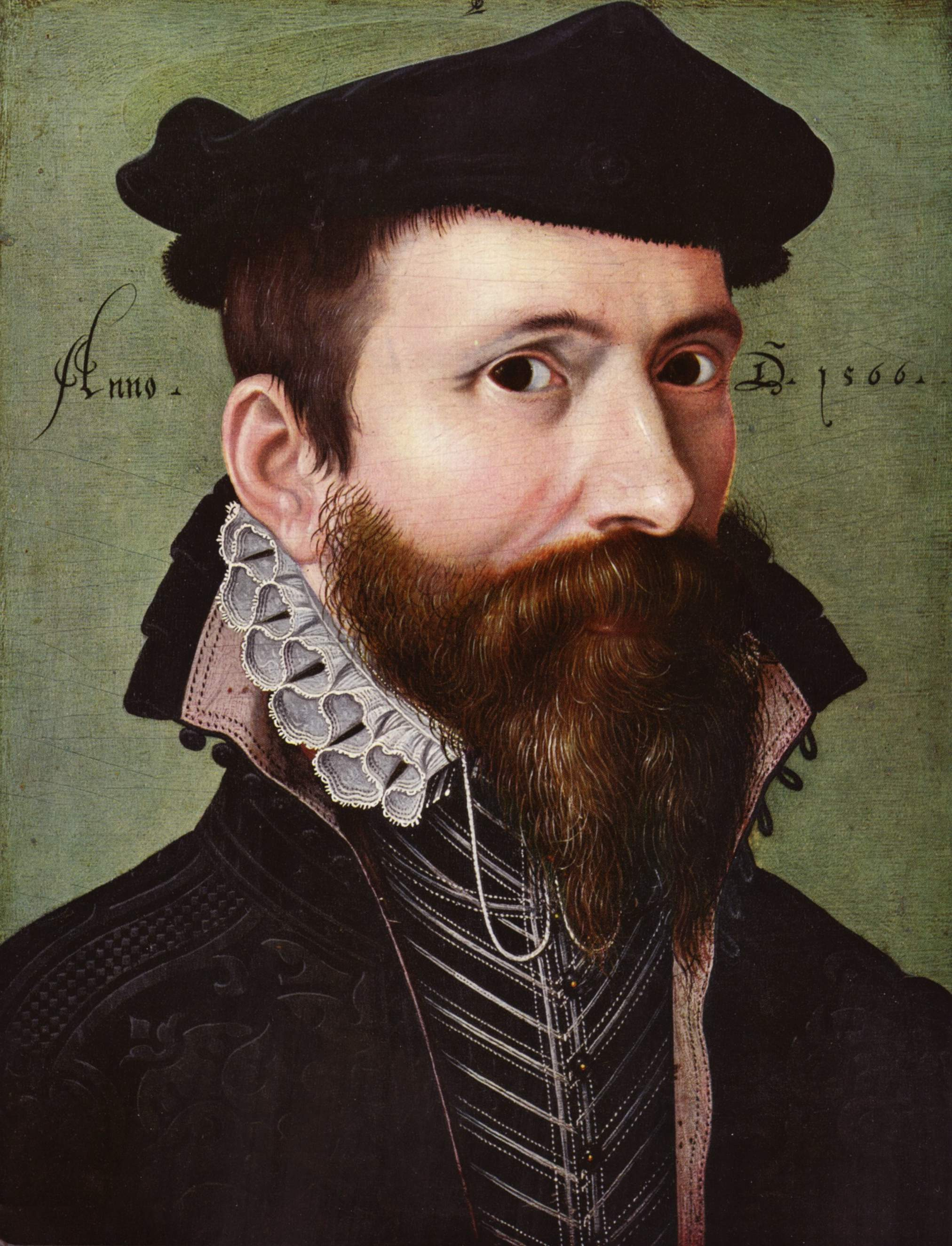
8 – 1566

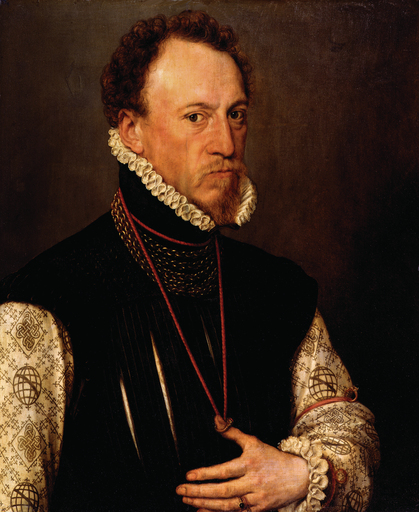
9 – 1568
1. King Edward VI wears matching black doublet, paned hose, and robe trimmed with bands of gold braid or embroidery closed with jewels, c. 1550.
2. Antoine de Bourbon wears an embroidered black doublet with worked buttons and a matching robe. His high collar is worn open at the top in the French fashion.
3. Don Gabriel de la Cueva wears a jerkin with short slashed sleeves over a red satin doublet. His velvet hose are made in wide panes over a full lining, 1566.
4. Prospero Alessandri wears a severe black jerkin with the new, shorted bases over a light grey doublet with rows of parallel cuts between bands of gold braid. His rose-coloured pansied slops are also decorated with cuts and narrow applied gold trim, 1560.
5. King Erik XIV wears a red doublet with gold embroidery and red paned hose in the same fashion. He also wears reddish silk stockings, c. 1560.
6. Thomas Howard, Duke of Norfolk wears a shirt trimmed in black on ruff and sleeve ruffles. He wears a belt pouch at his waist. 1563.
7. Charles IX of France wears an embroidered black jerkin with long bases or skirts over a white satin doublet and matching padded hose, 1566.
8. Highnecked black jerkin fastens with buttons and loops. The detailed stitching on the lining can be seen. The black-and-white doublet below also fastens with tiny buttons, German, 1566.
9. Portrait of Henry Lee of Ditchley in a black jerkin over a white satin doublet decorated with a pattern of armillary spheres, 1568.

=== Style gallery 1570s ===
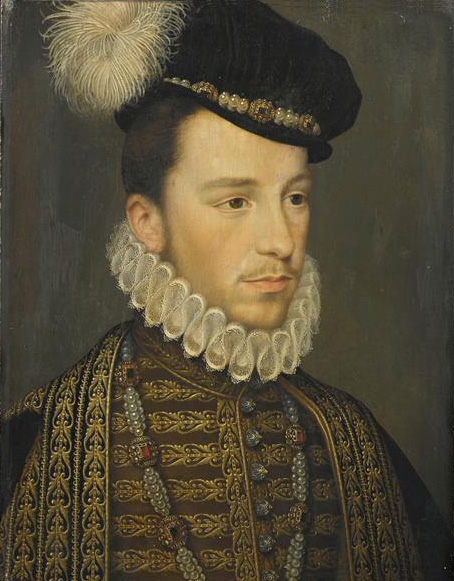
1 – 1573–74

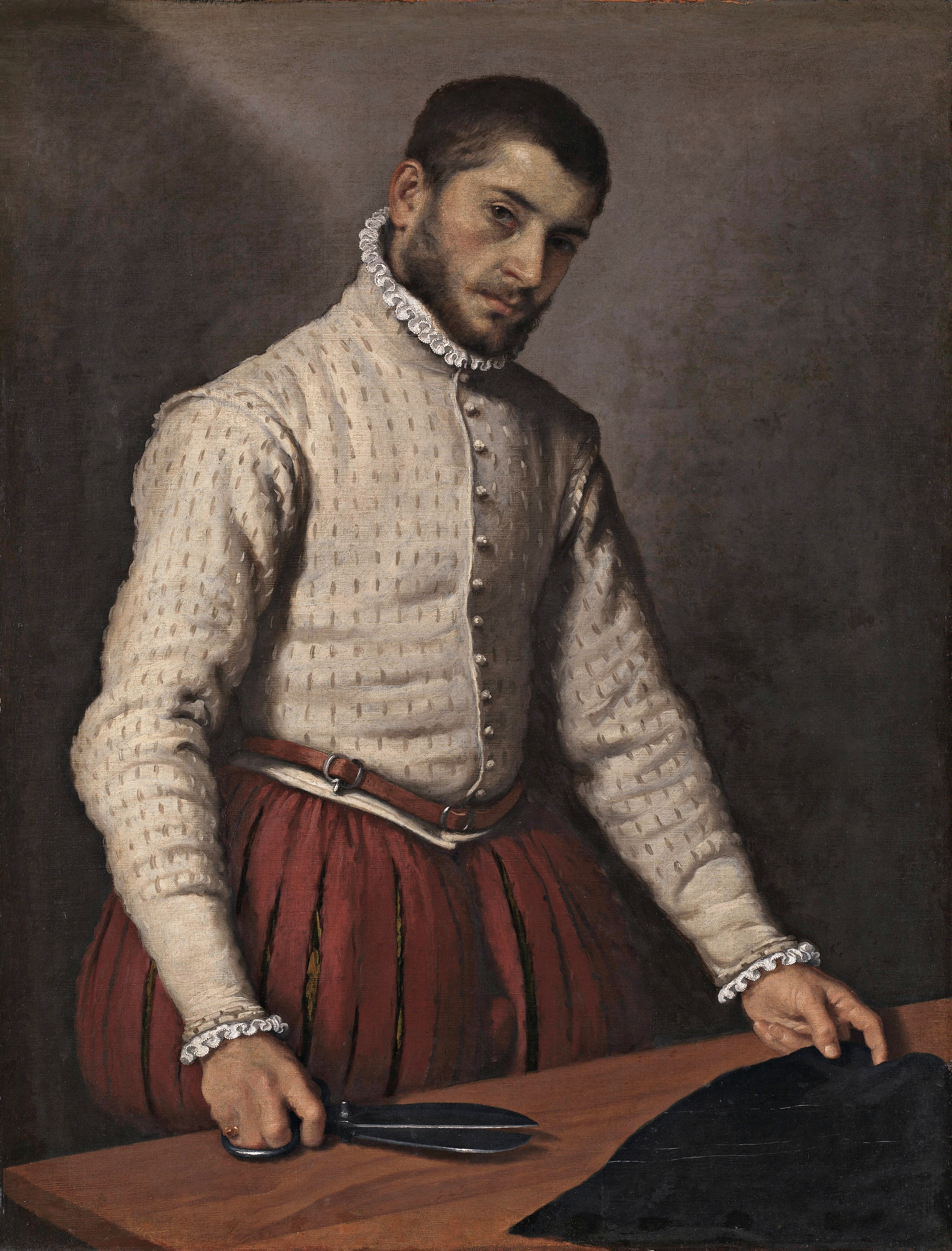
2 – c. 1570

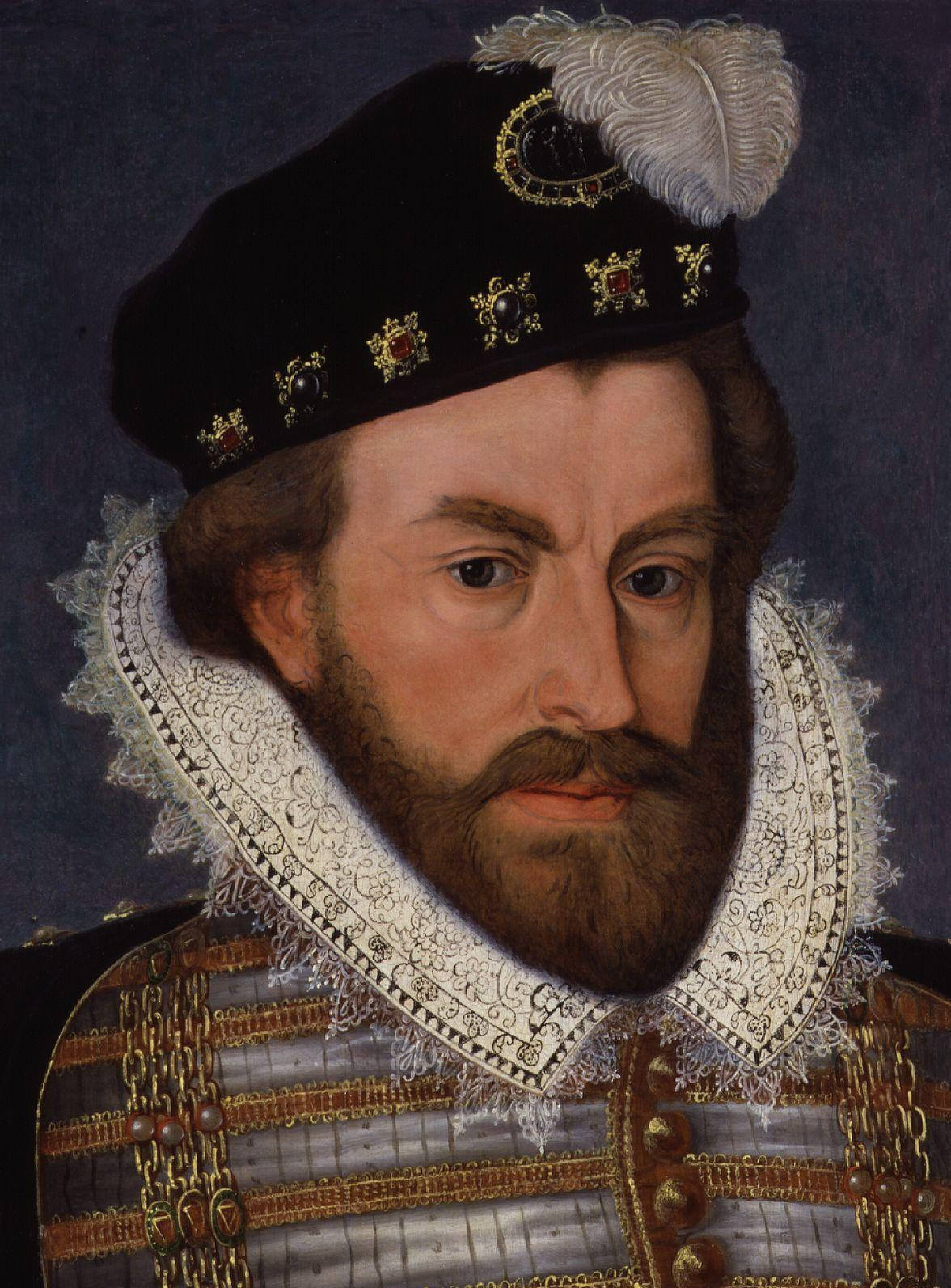
3 – c. 1575

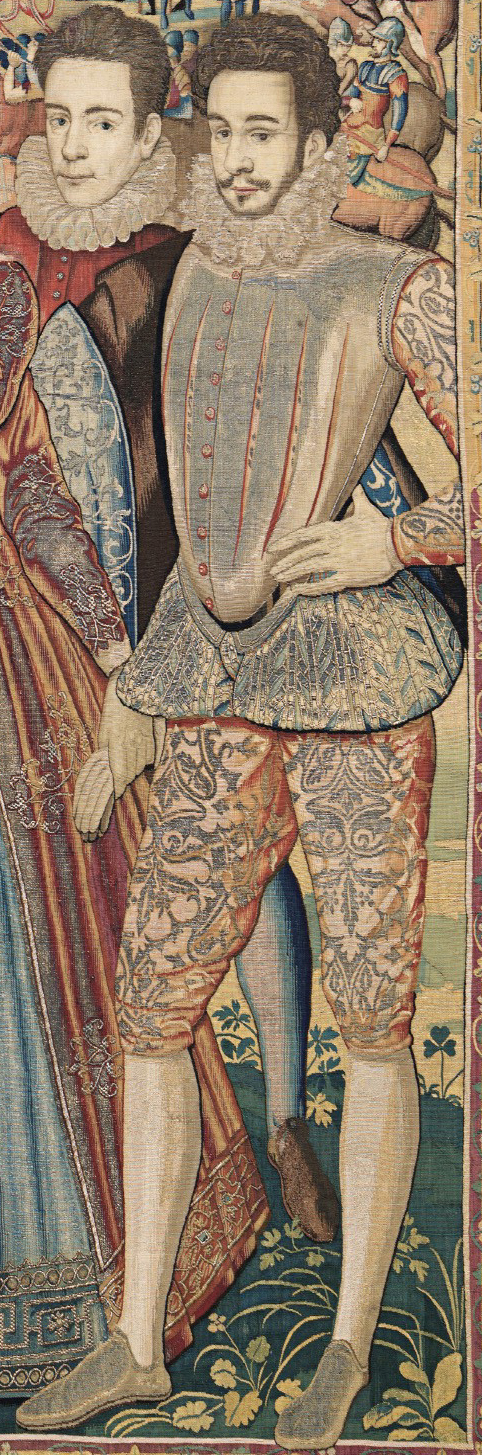
4 – c. 1576

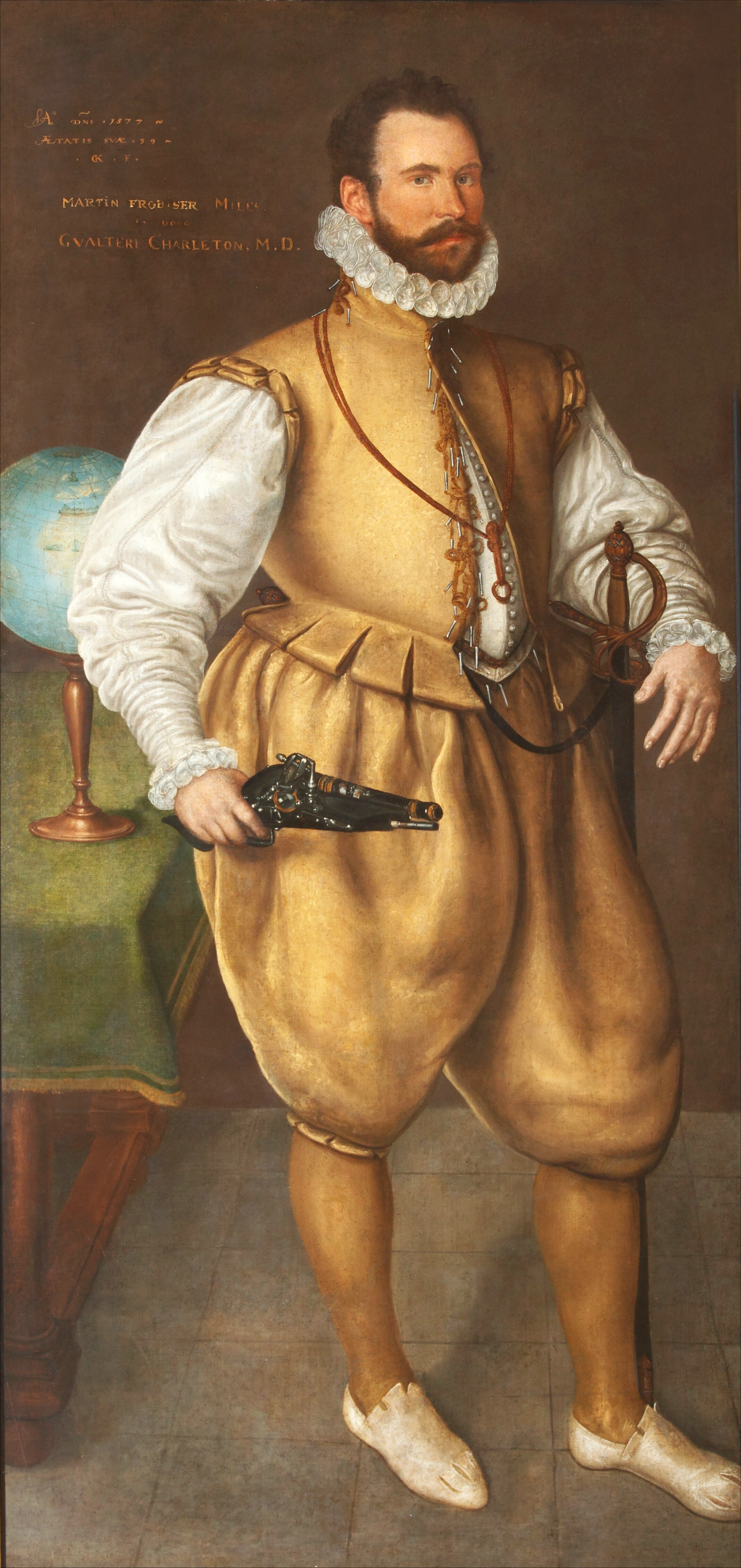
5 – 1577

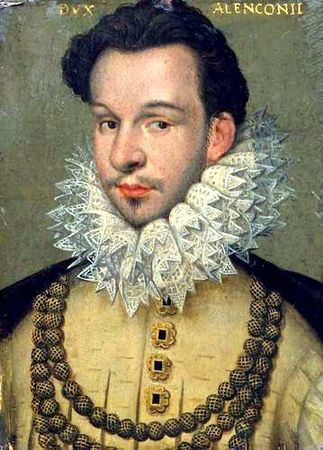
6 – 1577

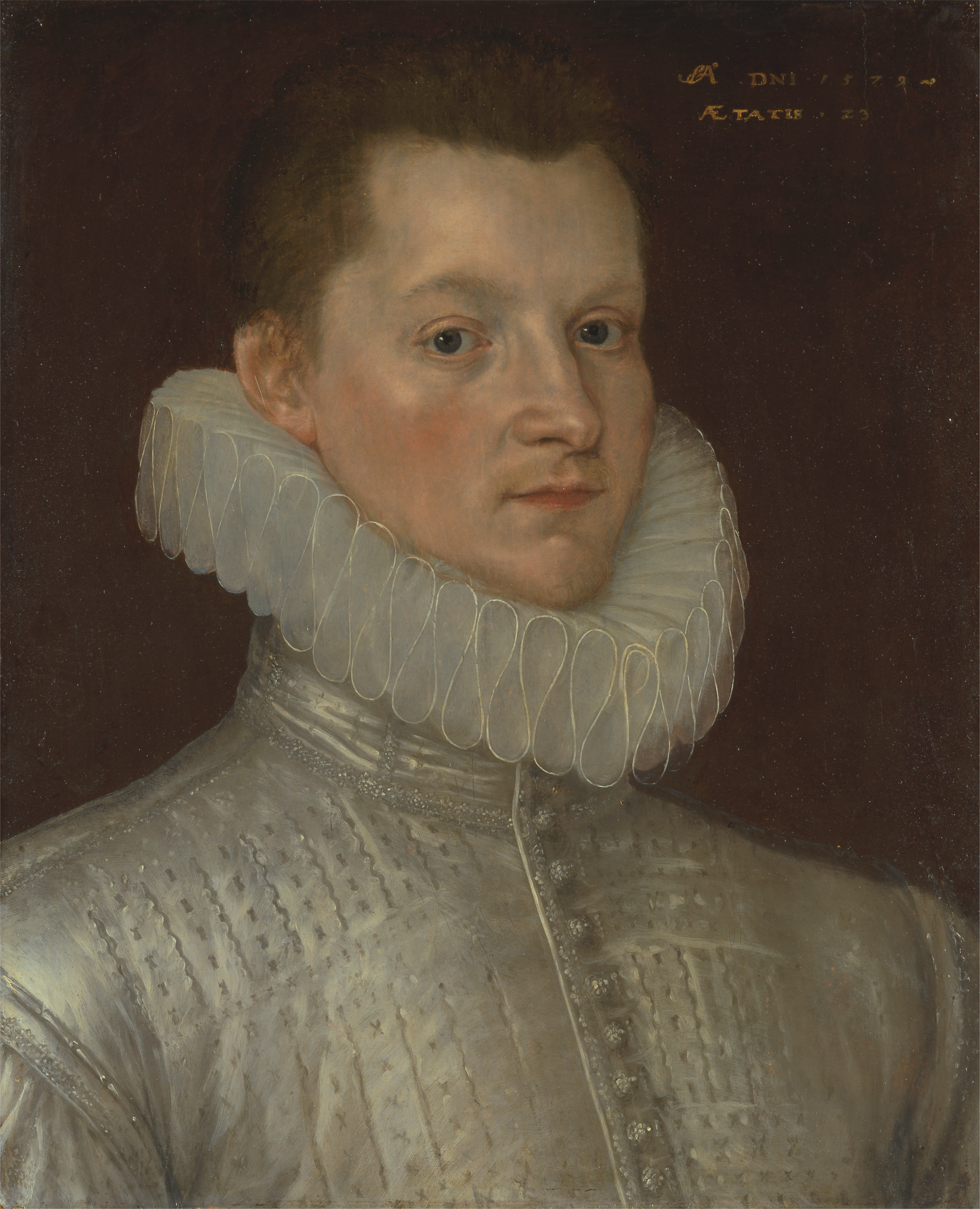
7 - 1579
1. Henry, Duke of Anjou, the future Henry III of France, wears doublet and matching cape with the high collar and figure-of-eight ruff of c. 1573–74.
2. An Italian tailor wears a pinked doublet over heavily padded hose. His shirt has a small ruff.
3. Sir Christopher Hatton's shirt collar is embroidered with blackwork, 1575.
4. French fashion features very short pansied slops over canions and peascode-bellied doublets and jerkins, the Valois Tapestries, c. 1576.
5. Sir Martin Frobisher in a peascod-bellied doublet with full sleeves under a buff jerkin with matching hose, 1577.
6. Miniature of the Duc d'Alençon shows a deep figure-of-eight ruff in pointed lace (probably reticella). Note the jeweled buttons on his doublet fasten to one side of the front opening, not down the center, 1577.
7. John Smythe wears a pinked white doublet with worked buttons and a plain linen ruff, 1579.

=== Style gallery 1580s–1590s ===
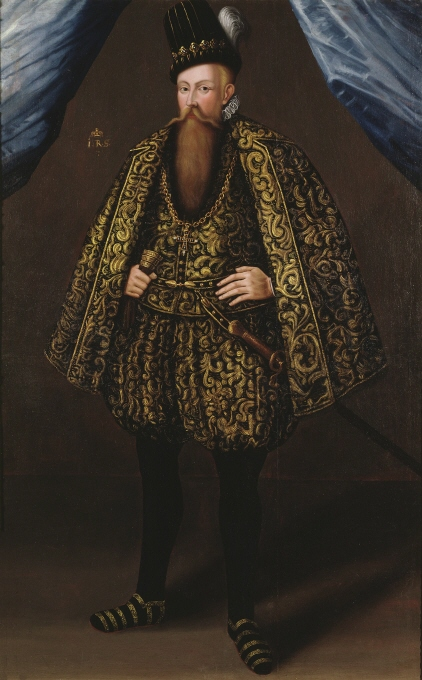
1 – 1582

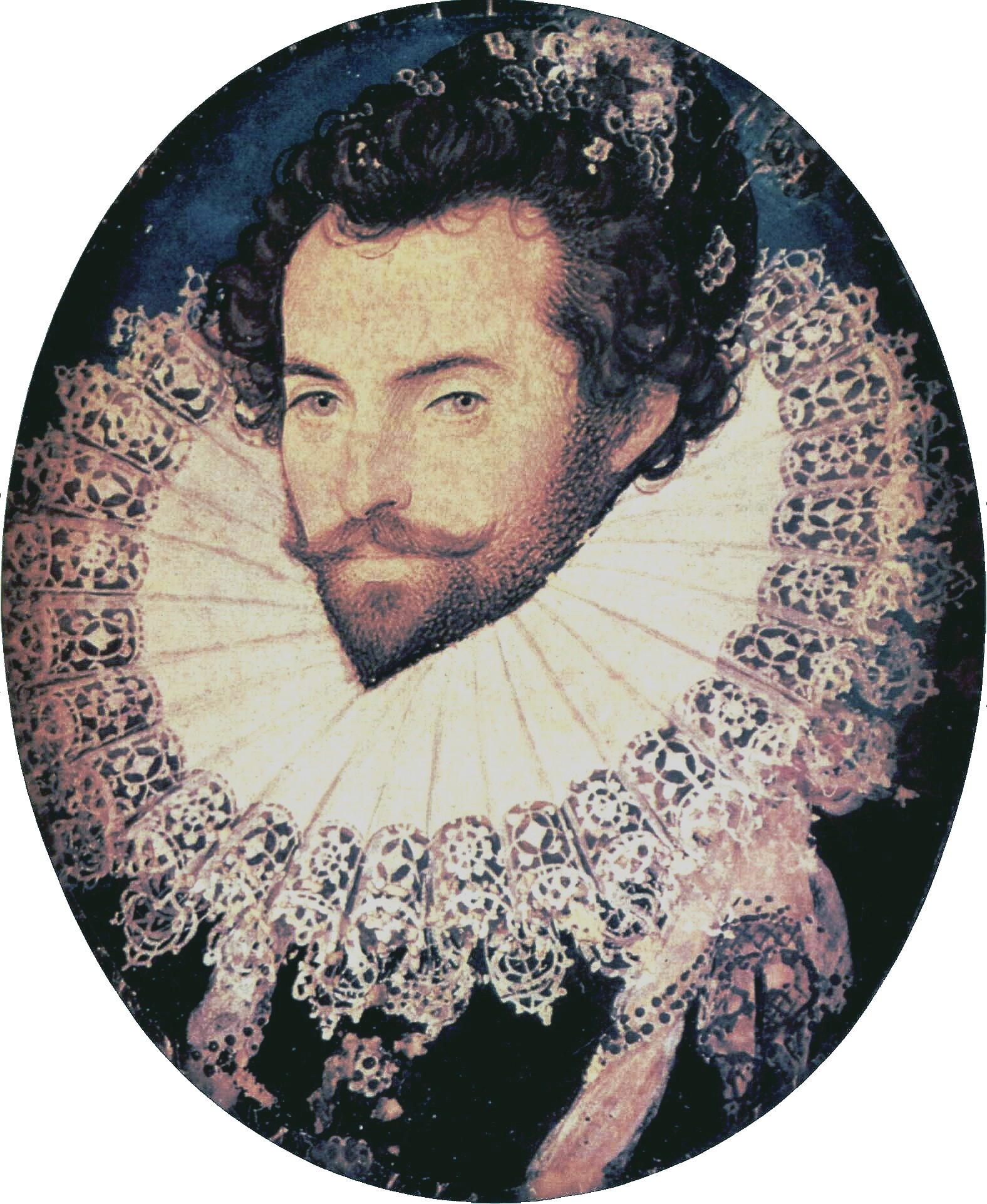
2 – 1585

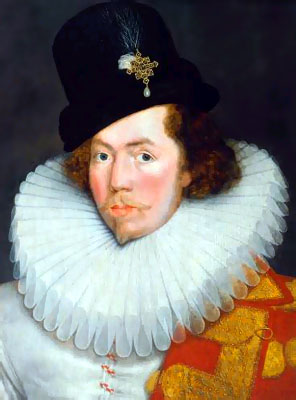
3 – 1586

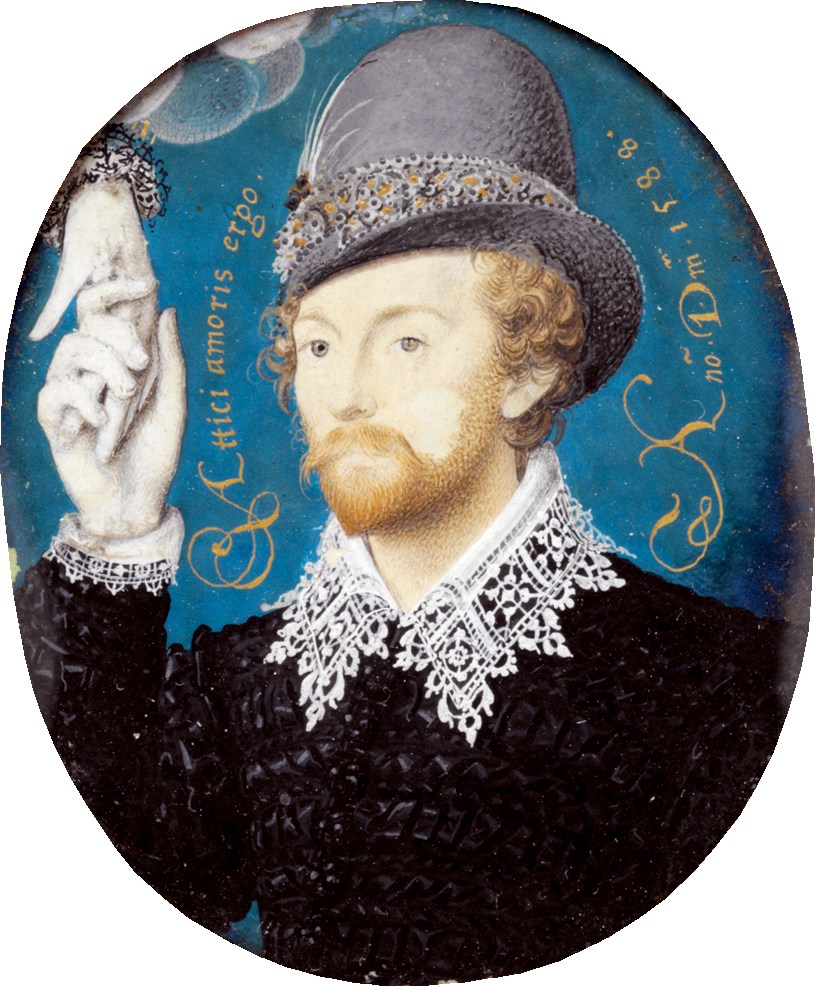
4 – 1588

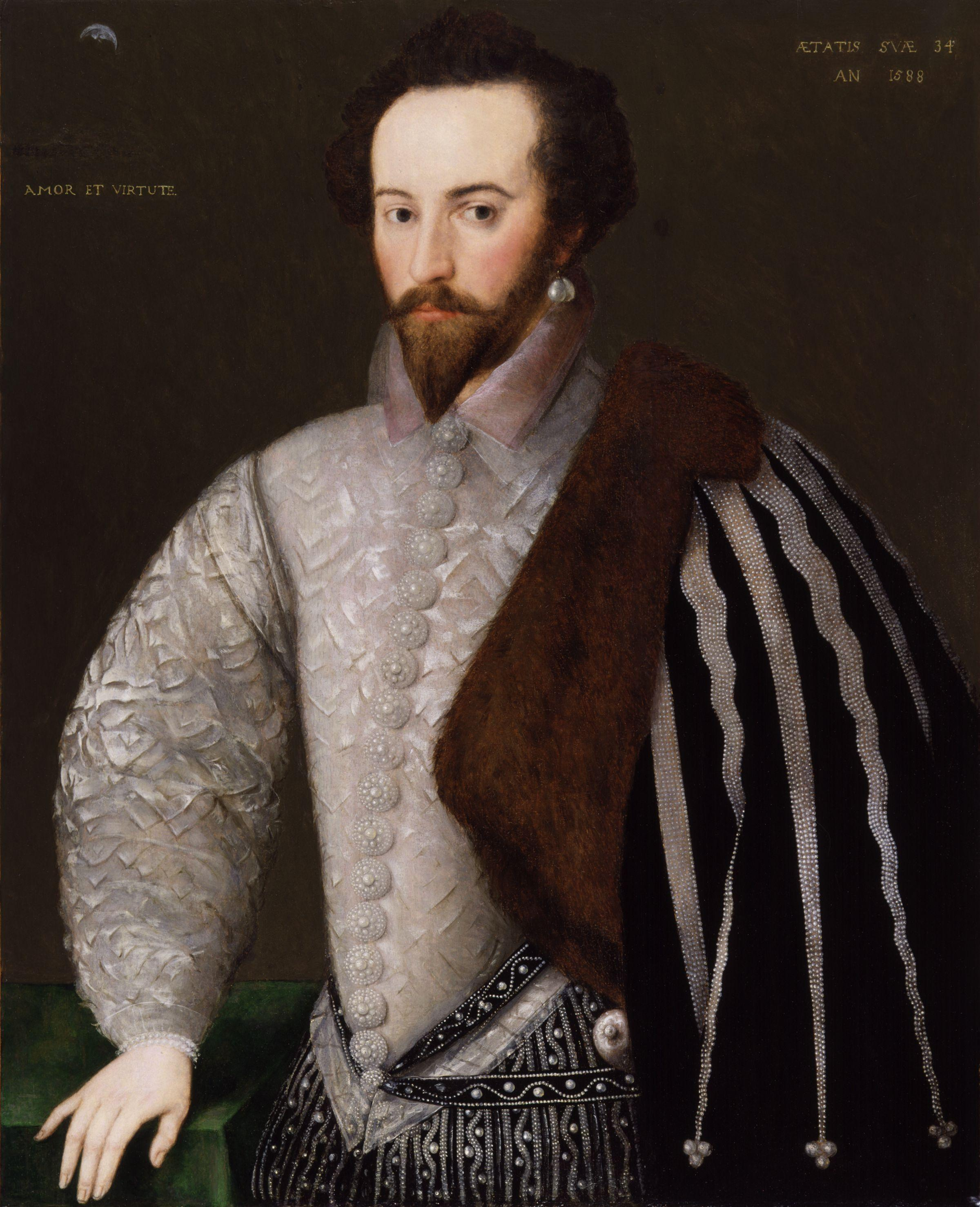
5 – 1588

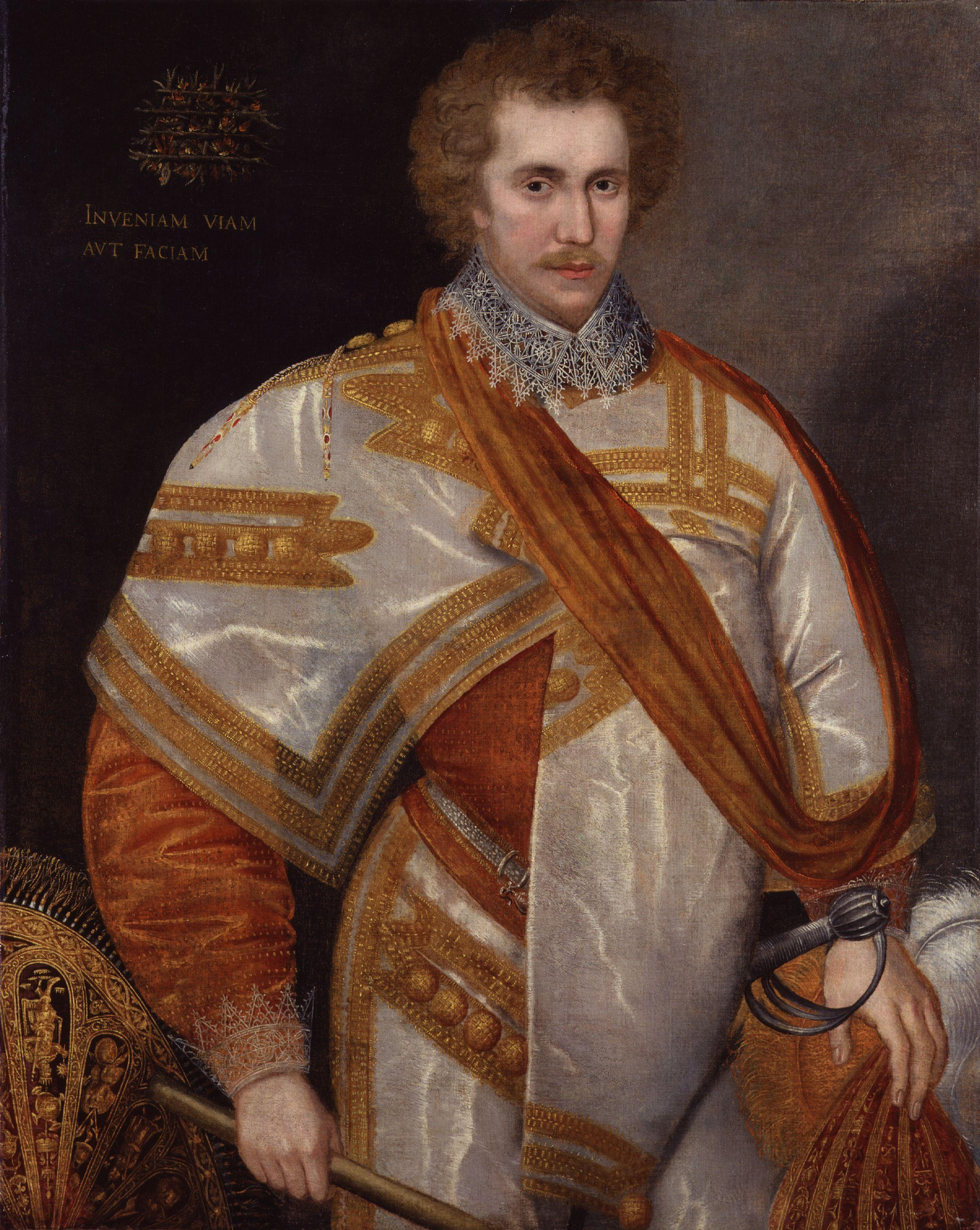
6 – 1588

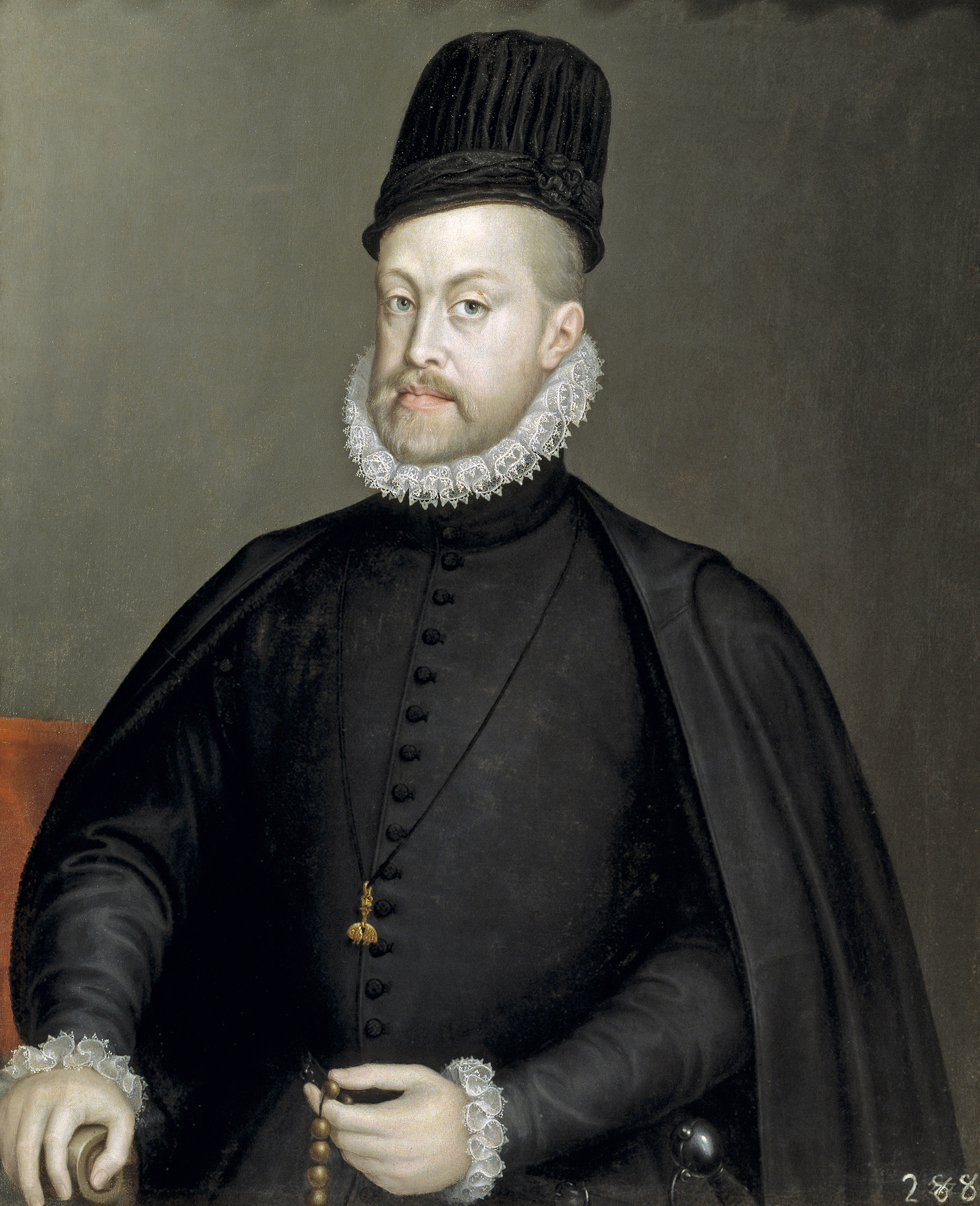
7 – 1590s

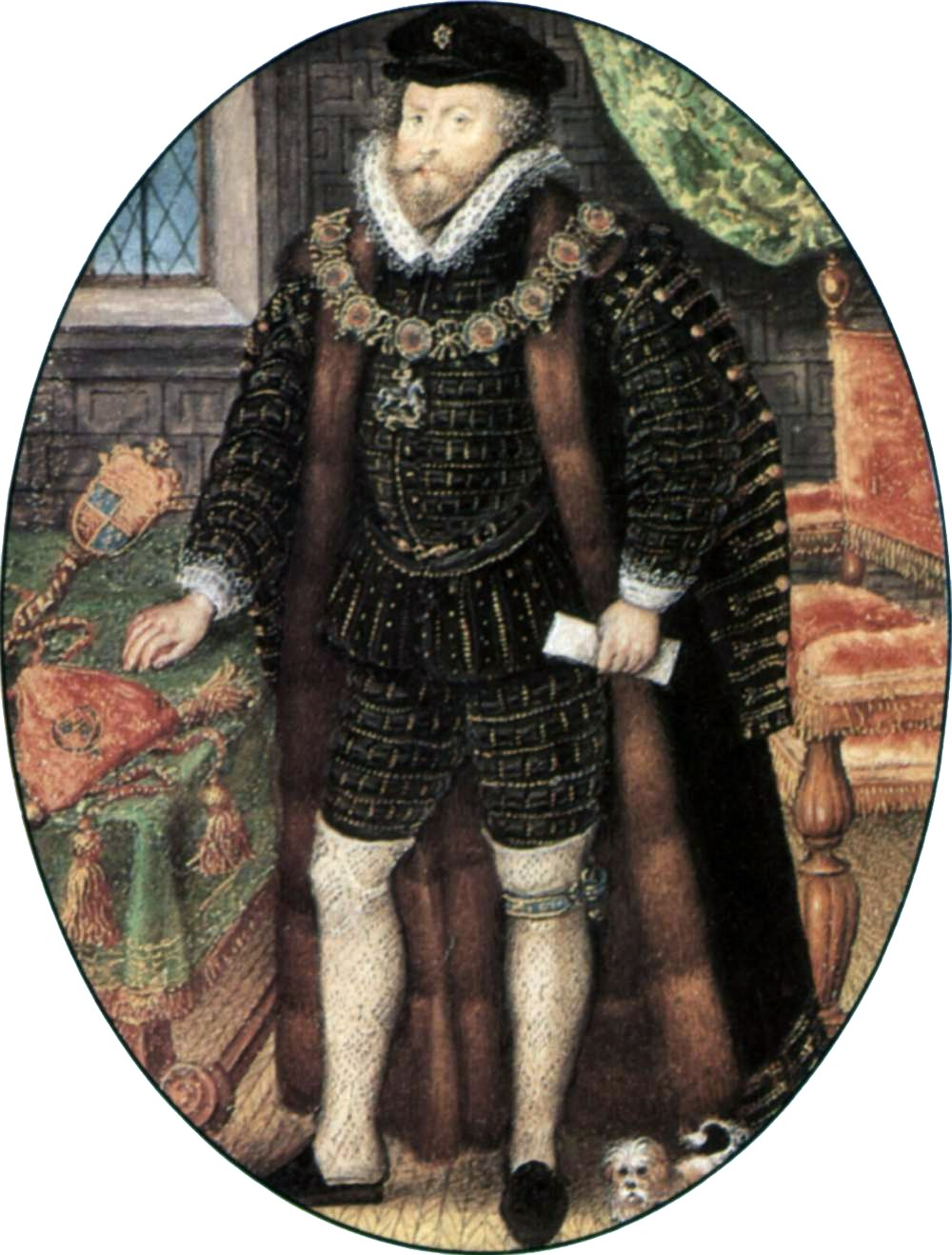
8 – c. 1590

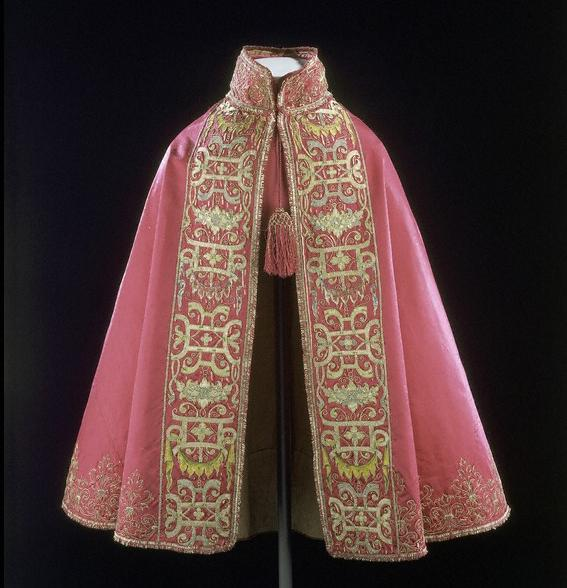
9 – 1580–1600
1. King Johan III of Sweden shown in a black doublet with golden embroidery, with matching hose. Black silk stockings, and black shoes with golden embroidery. He also wears a cape in the same fashion. He wears a black top hat with golden embroidery and white feathers, 1582.
2. Miniature of Sir Walter Raleigh shows a linen cartwheel ruff with lace (possibly reticella) edging and the stylish small pointed beard of 1585.
3. Sir Henry Unton wears the cartwheel ruff popular in England in the 1580s. His white satin doublet is laced with a red-and-white cord at the neck. A red cloak with gold trim is slung fashionably over one shoulder, and he wears a tall black hat with a feather, 1586.
4. Unknown man of 1588 wears a lace or cutwork-edged collar rather than a ruff, with matching sleeve cuffs. He wears a tall grey hat with a feather which is called capotain.
5. Sir Walter Raleigh wears the Queen's colors (black and white). His cloak is lined and collared with fur, 1588.
6. Robert Sidney wears a loose military jacket called a mandilion colley-westonward, or with the sleeves hanging in front and back, 1588.
7. Philip II of Spain (d. 1598) in old age. Spanish fashion changed very little from the 1560s to the end of the century.
8. Sir Christopher Hatton wears a fur-lined robe with hanging sleeves over a slashed doublet and hose, with the livery collar of the Order of the Garter, c. 1590.
9. Man's cloak of red satin, couched and embroidered with silver, silver-gilt and coloured silk threads, trimmed with silver-gilt and silk thread fringe and tassel, and lined with pink linen, 1580–1600 (V&A Museum no. 793–1901).

== Footwear ==
Men's shoes c. 1600

Elizabeth I's shoes, 1592

Fashionable shoes for men and women were similar, with a flat one-piece sole and rounded toes. Shoes were fastened with ribbons, laces or simply slipped on. Shoes and boots became narrower, followed the contours of the foot, and covered more of the foot, in some cases up to the ankle, than they had previously. As in the first half of the century, shoes were made from soft leather, velvet, or silk. In Spain, Italy, and Germany the slashing of shoes also persisted into the latter half of the century. In France however, slashing slowly went out of fashion and coloring the soles of footwear red began. Aside from slashing, shoes in this period could be adorned with all sorts of cord, quilting, and frills. Thick-soled pattens were worn over delicate indoor shoes to protect them from the muck of the streets. A variant on the patten popular in Venice was the chopine – a platform-soled mule that raised the wearer sometimes as high as two feet off the ground.

== Children's fashion ==
Toddler boys wore gowns or skirts and doublets until they were breeched.

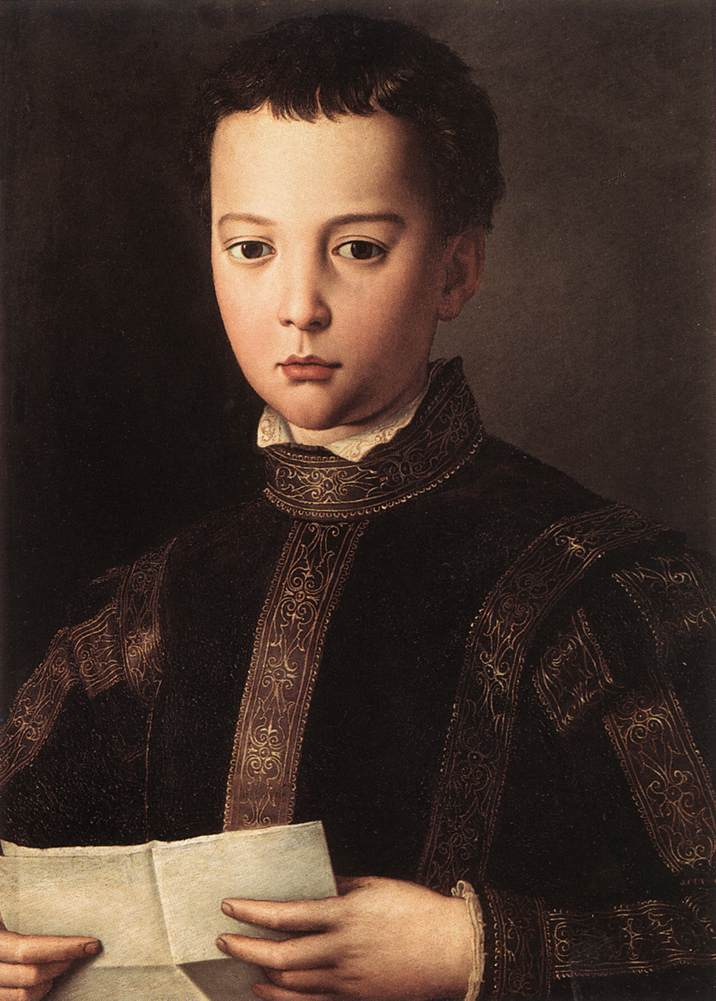
1 – 1551

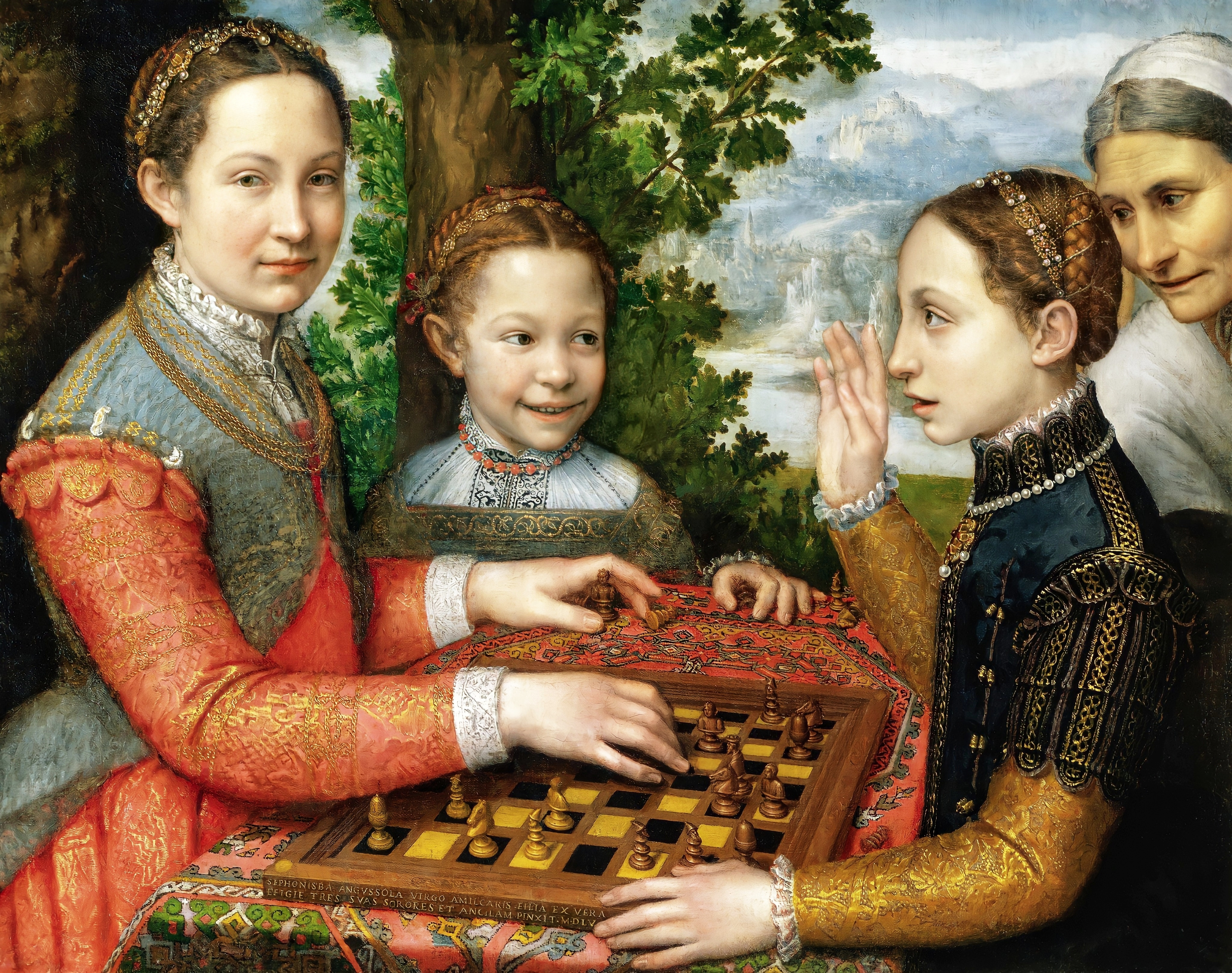
2 – 1555

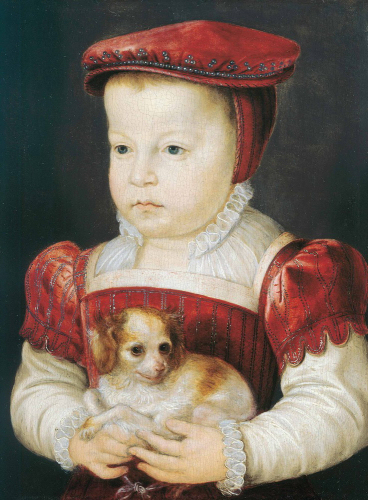
3 – 1556–58

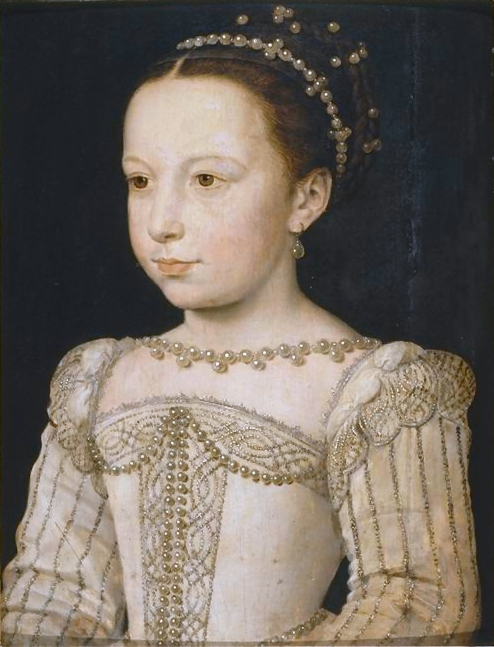
4 – 1560

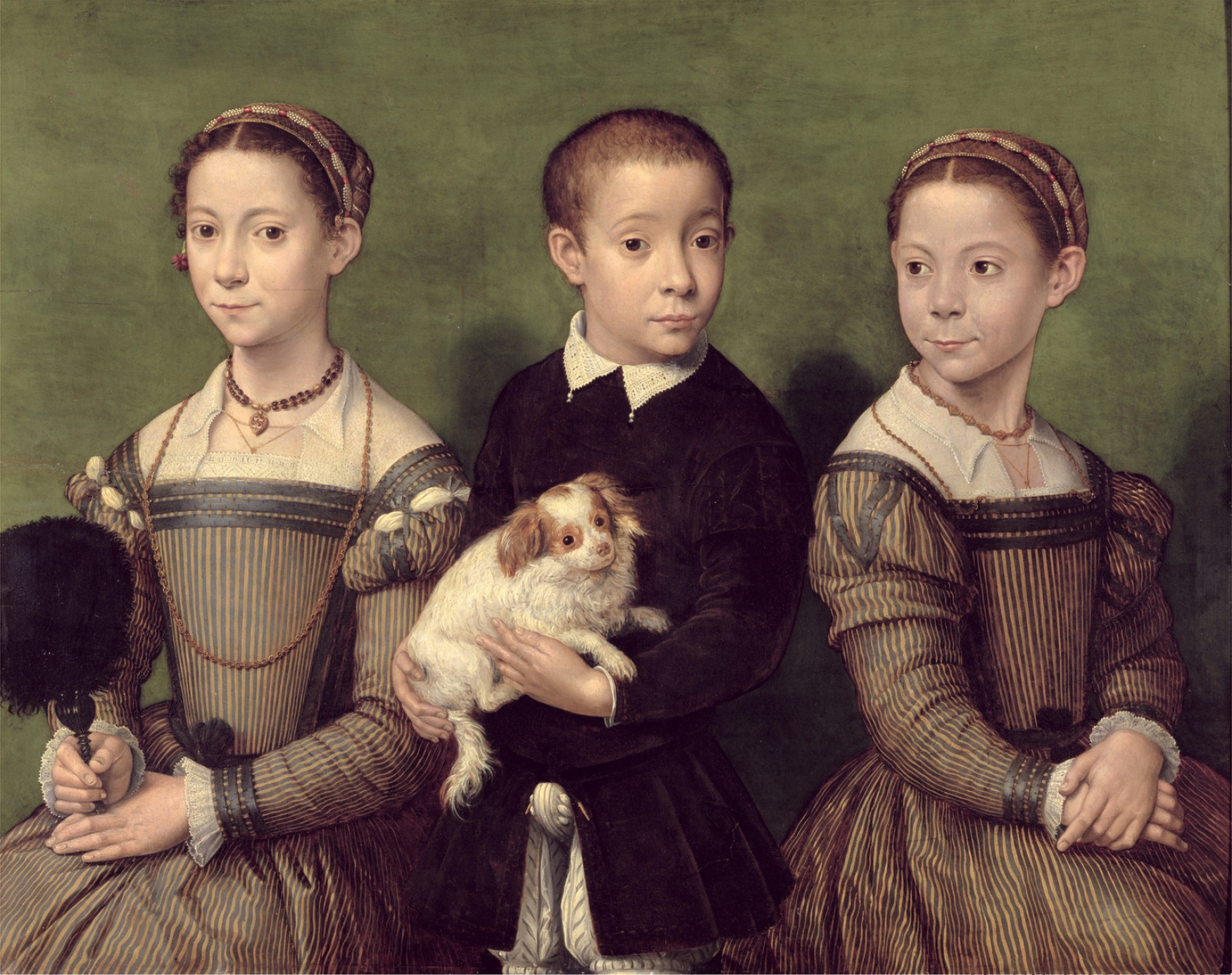
5 – c. 1570

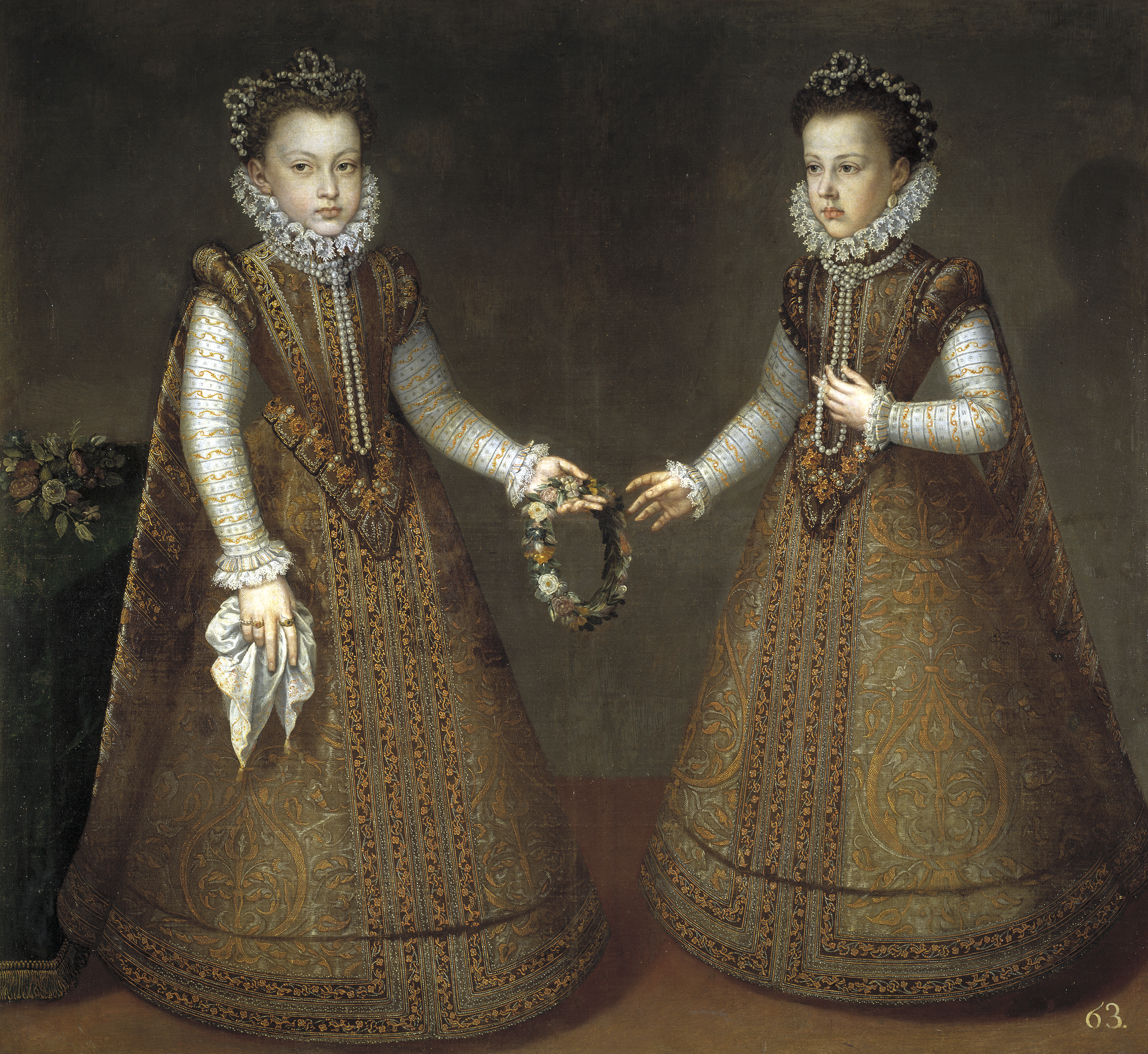
6 – c. 1571

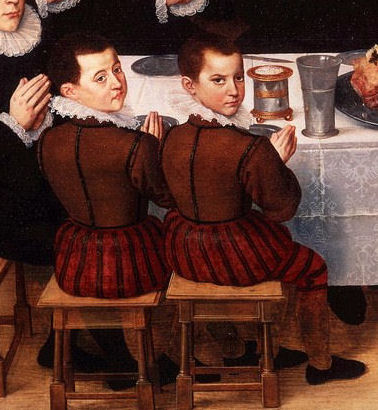
7 – 1585

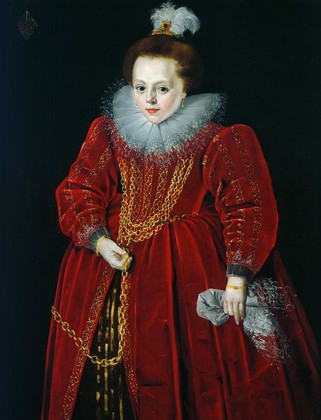
8 – 1586

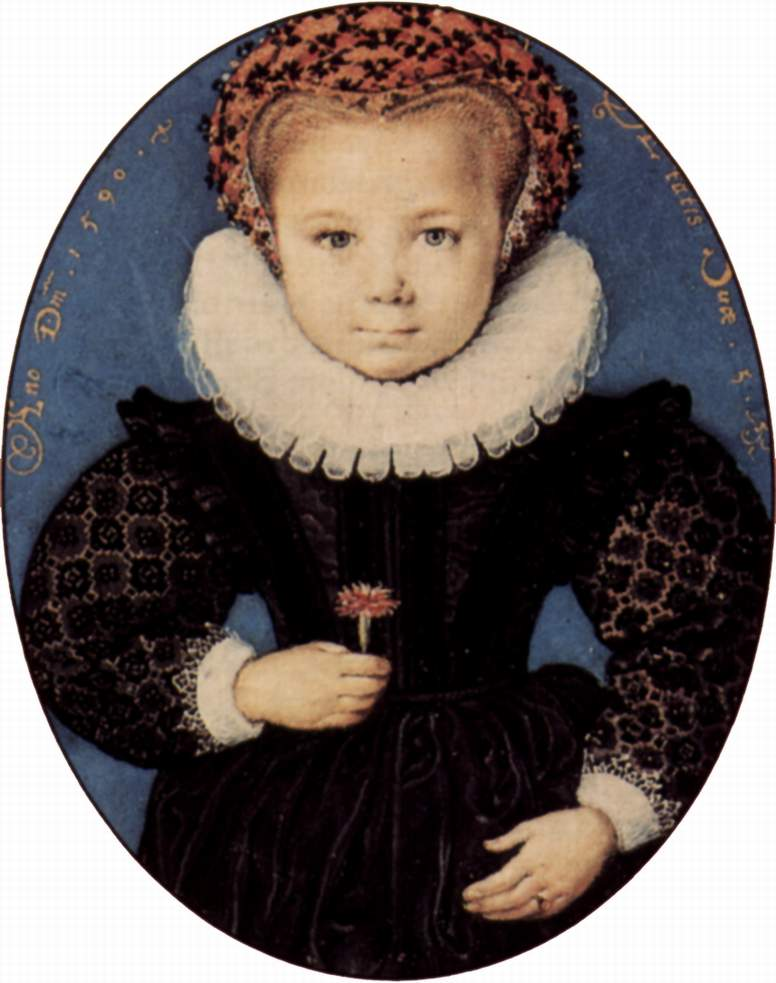
9 – 1590

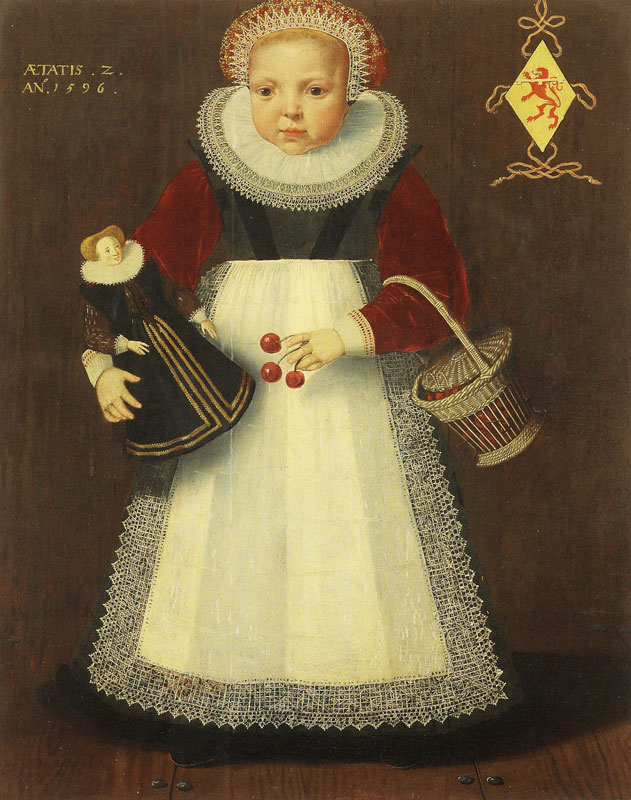
10 – 1596

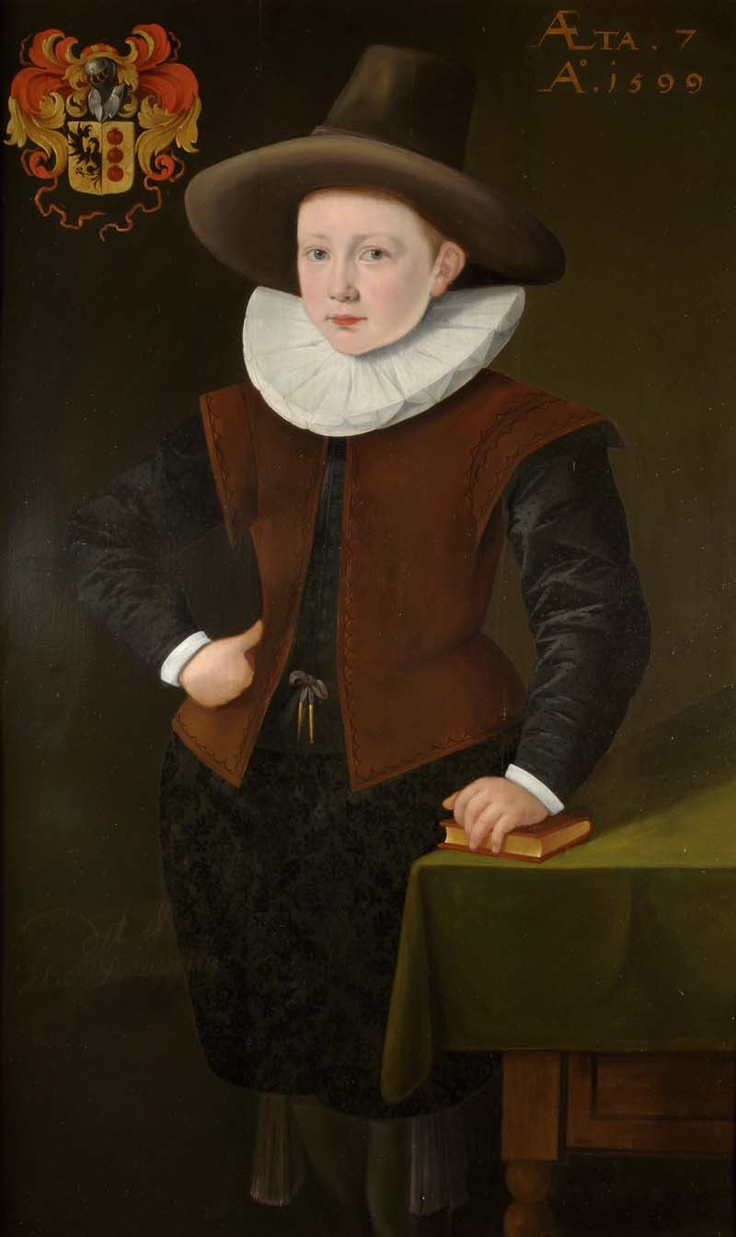
11 – 1599
1. Francesco de Medici wears an unusual doublet (or robe?) that appears to fasten up the back, Italy, 1551
2. The sisters of Sofonisba Anguissola wears fashionable dresses suitable for aristocratic daughters in Italy, 1555
3. François Duke of Alençon, France, 1556–58
4. The French princess Marguerite of Valois wears a white gown with embroidery and pearls. Her hair is twisted and coiled against her head and pinned in place with pearls, 1560.
5. Italian children, c. 1570. The girls wear gowns of striped fabric trimmed with bands of black, with linen chemises and partlets.
6. Infantas Isabella Clara Eugenia and Catalina Micaela of Spain wear miniature versions of adult costume, including gown with hanging sleeves and Spanish farthingales, c. 1571. Their skirts appear to have tucks to allow them to be let down as the girls grow.
7. Two boys at table wear brownish doublets and slops over cannions, the Low Countries, 1585.
8. Catherine van Arckel of Ammerzoden, aged 8, wears a red velvet dress with embroidery and several gold chains. Dutch, 1586.
9. A five-year-old child wears a coif, ruff, and lace-trimmed cuffs, England, 1590
10. A young girl wears a lace trimmed coif, lace collar and a lace apron, Netherlands, 1596
11. Hector van Bouricius wears a black jacket, black silk breeches, a ruff and hat, Netherlands, 1599

== Working class clothing ==
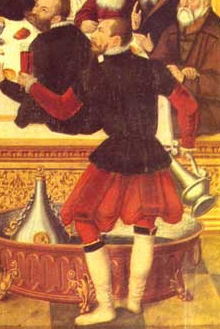
1 – 1565

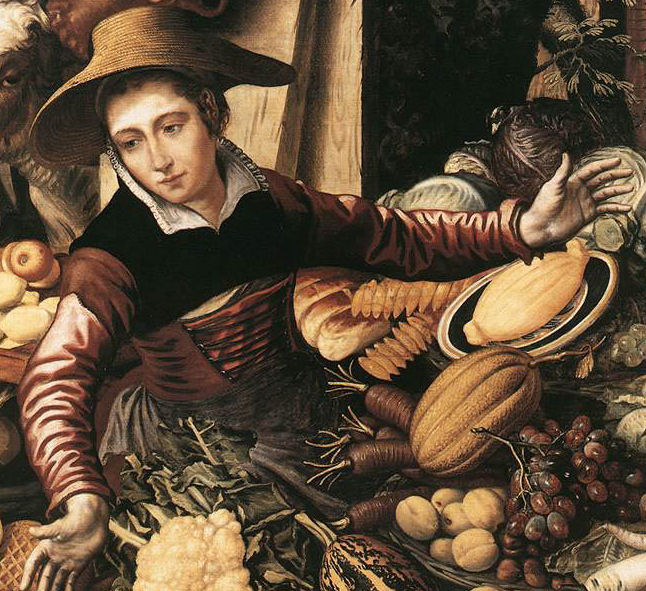
2 – 1567

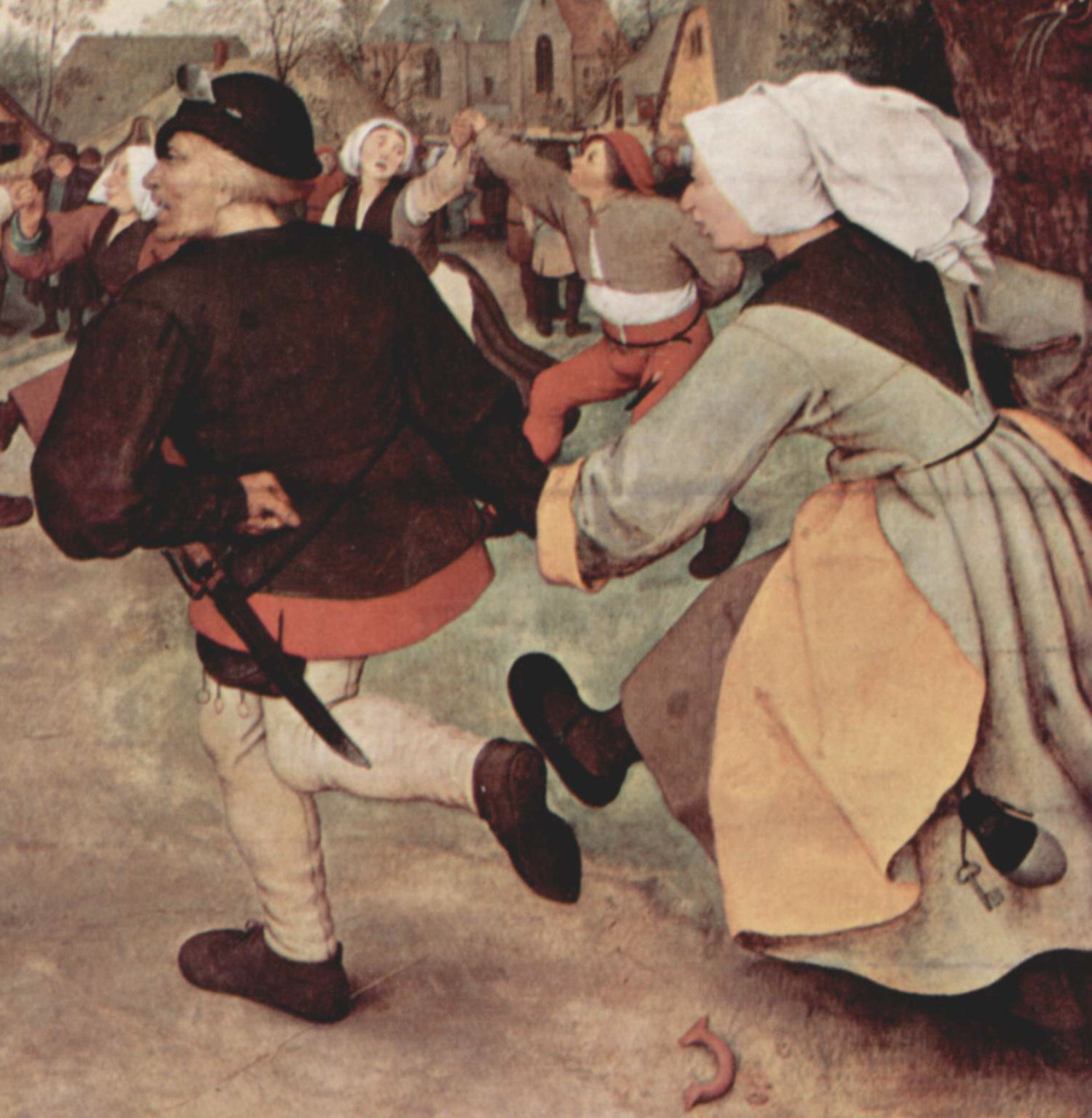
3 – 1568

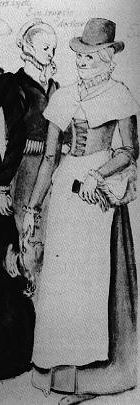
4 – 1570

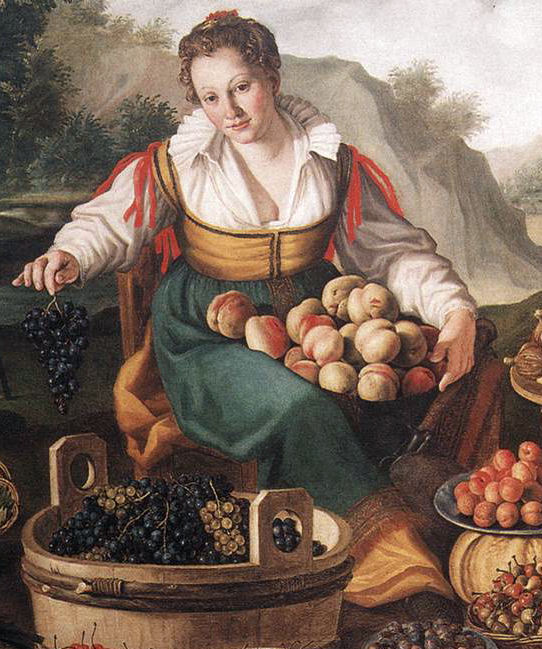
5 – c. 1580

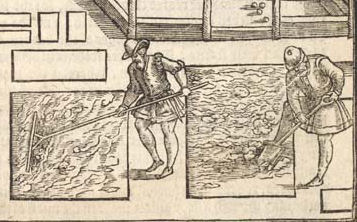
6 – 1594
1. German painting of the Last Supper in contemporary dress shows a table servant wearing pluderhosen with full, drooping linings, 1565.
2. Dutch vegetable seller wears a black partlet, a front-lacing brown gown over a pink kirtle with matching sleeves, and a gray apron. Her collar has a narrow ruffle, and she wears a coif or cap under a straw hat, 1567.
3. Flemish country folk. The woman in the foreground wears a gown with a contrasting lining tucked into her belt to display her kirtle. The woman at the back wears contrasting sleeves with her gown. Both women wear dark parlets; the V-neck front and pointed back are common in Flanders. They wear linen headdresses, probably a single rectangle of cloth pinned into a hood (note knots in the corners behind). Men wear baggy hose, short doublets (one with a longer jerkin beneath), and soft, round hats, 1568.
4. English countrywoman wears an open-fronted gown laced over a kirtle and a chemise with narrow ruffs at neck and wrists. A kerchief is pinned into a capelet or collar over her shoulders, and she wears a high-crowned hat over a coif, a chin-cloth, and an apron. She carries gloves in her left hand and a chicken in her right, c. 1555.
5. Italian fruit seller wears a front-fastening gown with ties or points for attaching sleeves, a green apron, and a chemise with a ruffled collar. Her uncovered hair is typical of Italian custom, c. 1580. Fruit and vegetable-sellers are often shown with more cleavage exposed than other women, whether reflecting a reality or an iconographic convention is hard to say. It might also reflect the common suspect in XVI Italy about the so-called "treccole", women that sold food of any kind in the streets; respectable people tended to see their going around as a sort of cover for prostitution or loose behaviour.
6. English gardeners wear cotes with full skirts, hose, hats, and low shoes, 1594.

== See also ==
- Blackwork
- Coif
- Doublet
- Elizabethan era
- Farthingale
- Hose
- Jerkin
- Ruff
- Zibellino
