= Grapheus =

Grapheus is a surname. Notable people with the surname include:

- Cornelius Grapheus
- Joannes Grapheus (1502–1571), Printer based in Antwerp

== See also ==
- Portrait of Abraham Grapheus, 1620 painting by Cornelis de Vos
