= Piccadill =

Large broad collar of cut-work lace

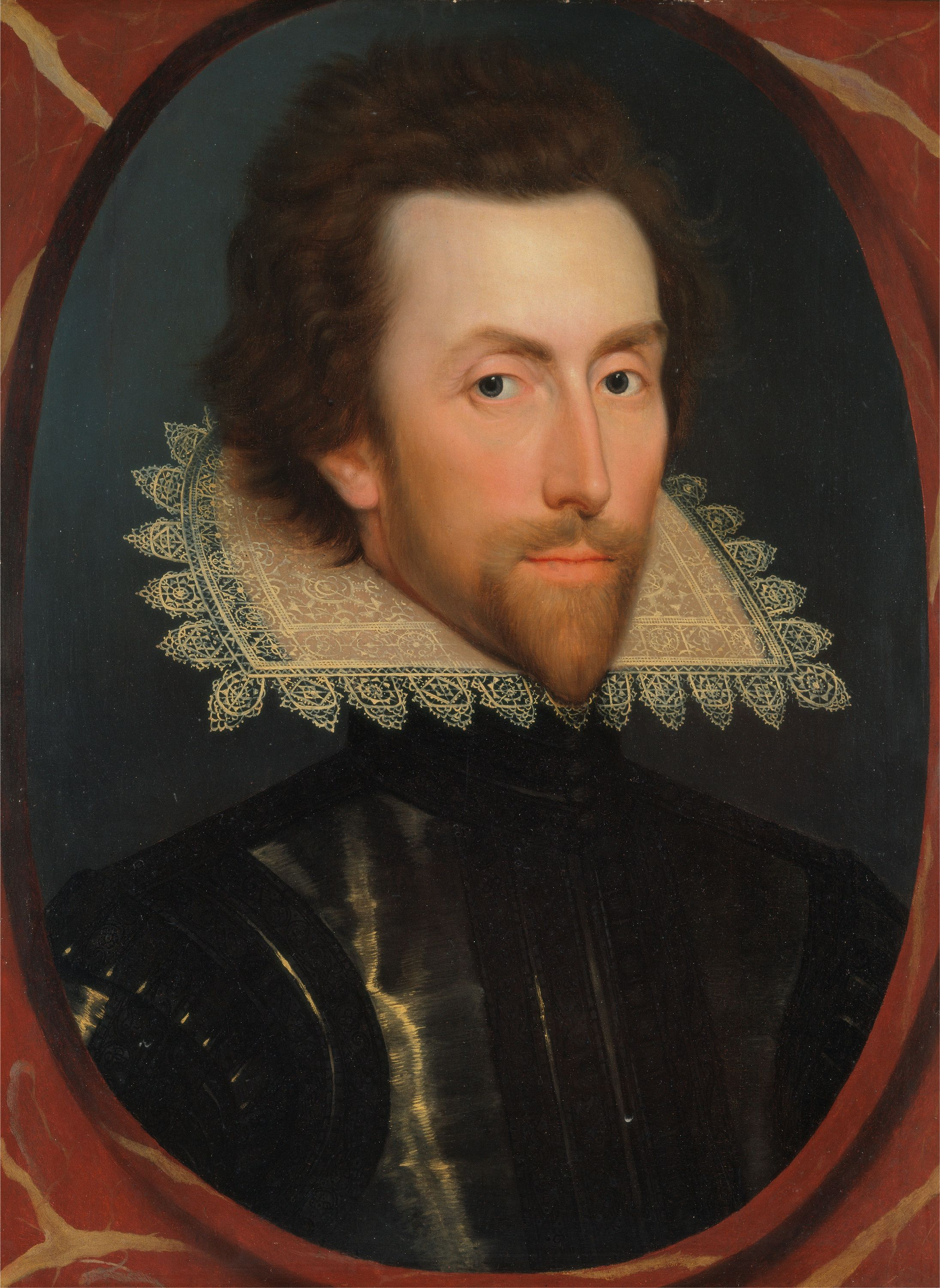
English nobleman Grey Brydges wearing a piccadill, painted by William Larkin c. 1615

A piccadill or pickadill is a large broad collar of cut-work lace that became fashionable in the late 16th century and early 17th century. The term is also used for the stiffened supporter or supportasse used to hold such a collar in place.

The term may originate from a conjectured Spanish word picadillo, from picado meaning punctured or pierced or the Welsh word pica meaning pointed. This is similar to the Spanish word picadura, used for the lace collars of the seventeenth century that contained much elaborate cut work point lace.

Examples of a piccadill can be seen on portraits of Queen Elizabeth I and other portraits of her contemporaries such as Sir Walter Raleigh.

Piccadilly, a street in central London, is believed to be named after the piccadill, perhaps because a landowner in the area once made his fortune from them.

== Gallery ==
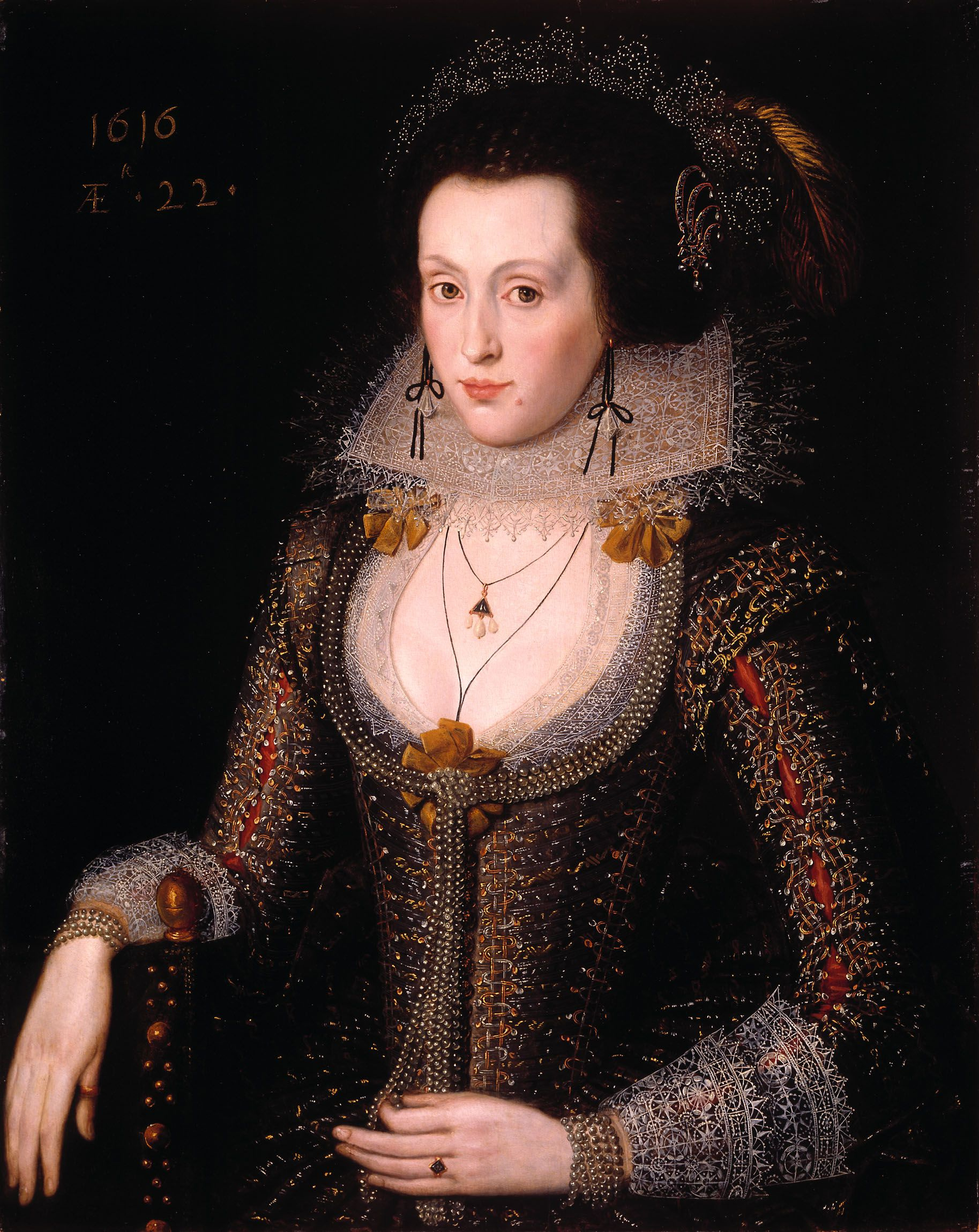
English noblewoman Elizabeth Poulett wearing a piccadill, painted by Robert Peake the Elder in 1616

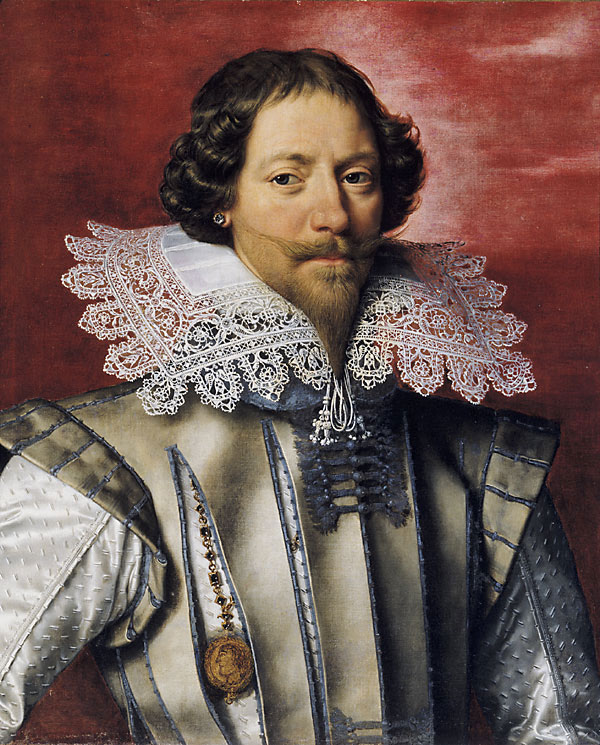
A French nobleman wearing a piccadill, painted by Frans Pourbus the Younger c. 1610 to 1620

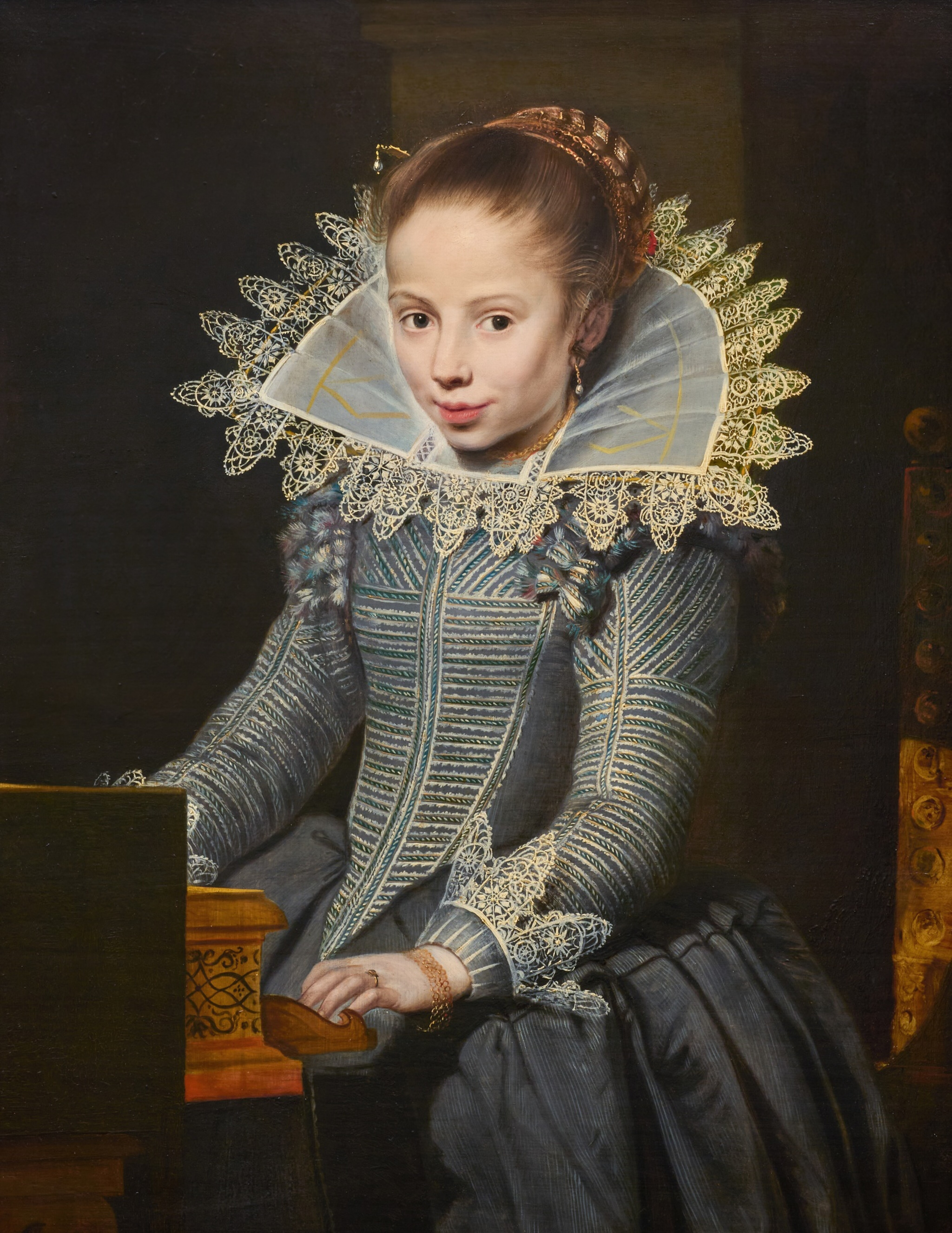
Unidentified Flemish young girl wearing a piccadill, painted by Cornelis de Vos in 1624 or 1625

== See also ==
- Ruff (clothing), a similar, contemporary fashion
- Collar (clothing)
