= Supportasse =

Stiffened support for a ruff or collar

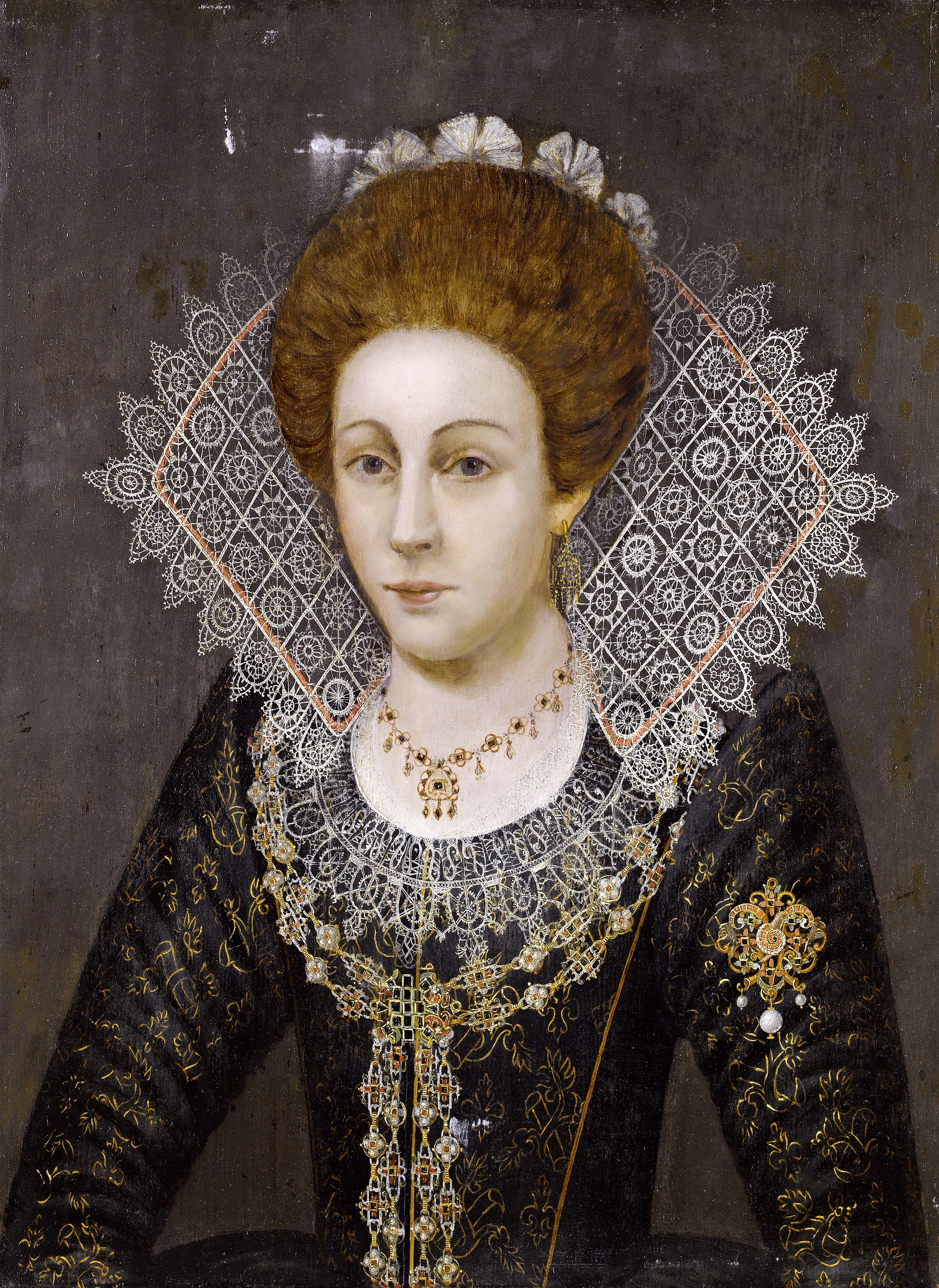
A red supportasse is visible beneath this stiffened lace collar. Follower of Robert Peake the Elder, Portrait of a Lady.

A supportasse or underpropper is a stiffened support for a ruff or collar. Essential items of courtly fashion in the late 16th and early 17th centuries, supportasses are sometimes called piccadills (picadils, pickadills), whisks, rebatos, or portefraise, terms used at different times for both the supporters and the various lace or linen collar styles to which they were attached.

I pray you, sir, what say you to these great ruffs, which are borne up with supporters and rebatoes, as it were with post and rail?

— Arthur Dent, The Plain Man's Pathway To Heaven (1631)

Decorative supportasses were often made of wire fashioned in loops and scallops, covered over with colored silk, gold, or silver thread. Supporters stiffened with cardboard or pasteboard and covered in silk or linen were also popular. They were held in place with ties or points fastened through worked holes at the back of the collar. Examples of both types of supportasse survive in the costume collections of the Victoria and Albert Museum, the Metropolitan Museum of Art, and the Musée national du Moyen Âge (formerly Musée de Cluny).

== Gallery ==
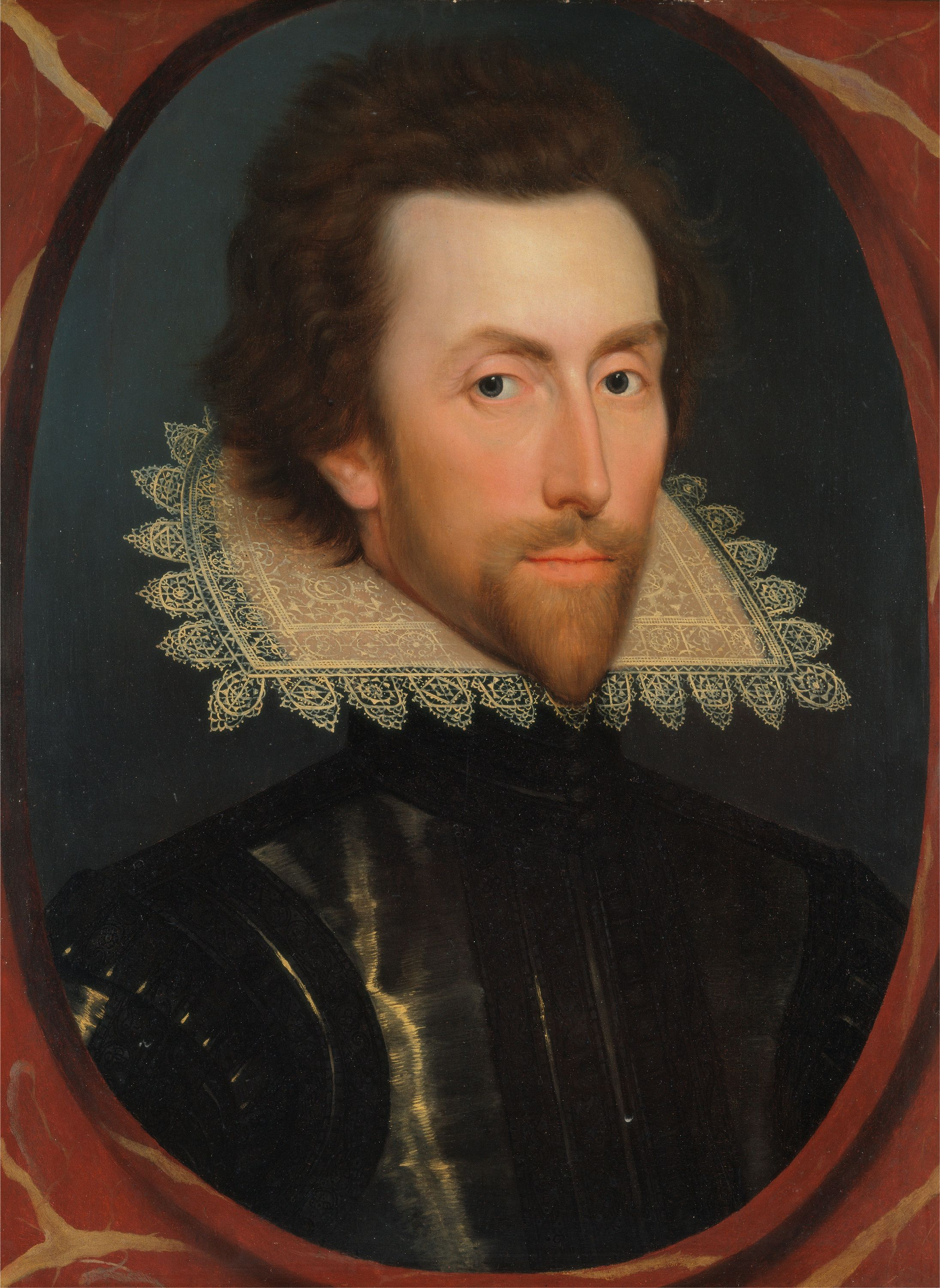
A fabric-covered supportasse is visible below the lace collar or rebato in this portrait of Grey Brydges, 5th Baron Chandos by William Larkin, c. 1615

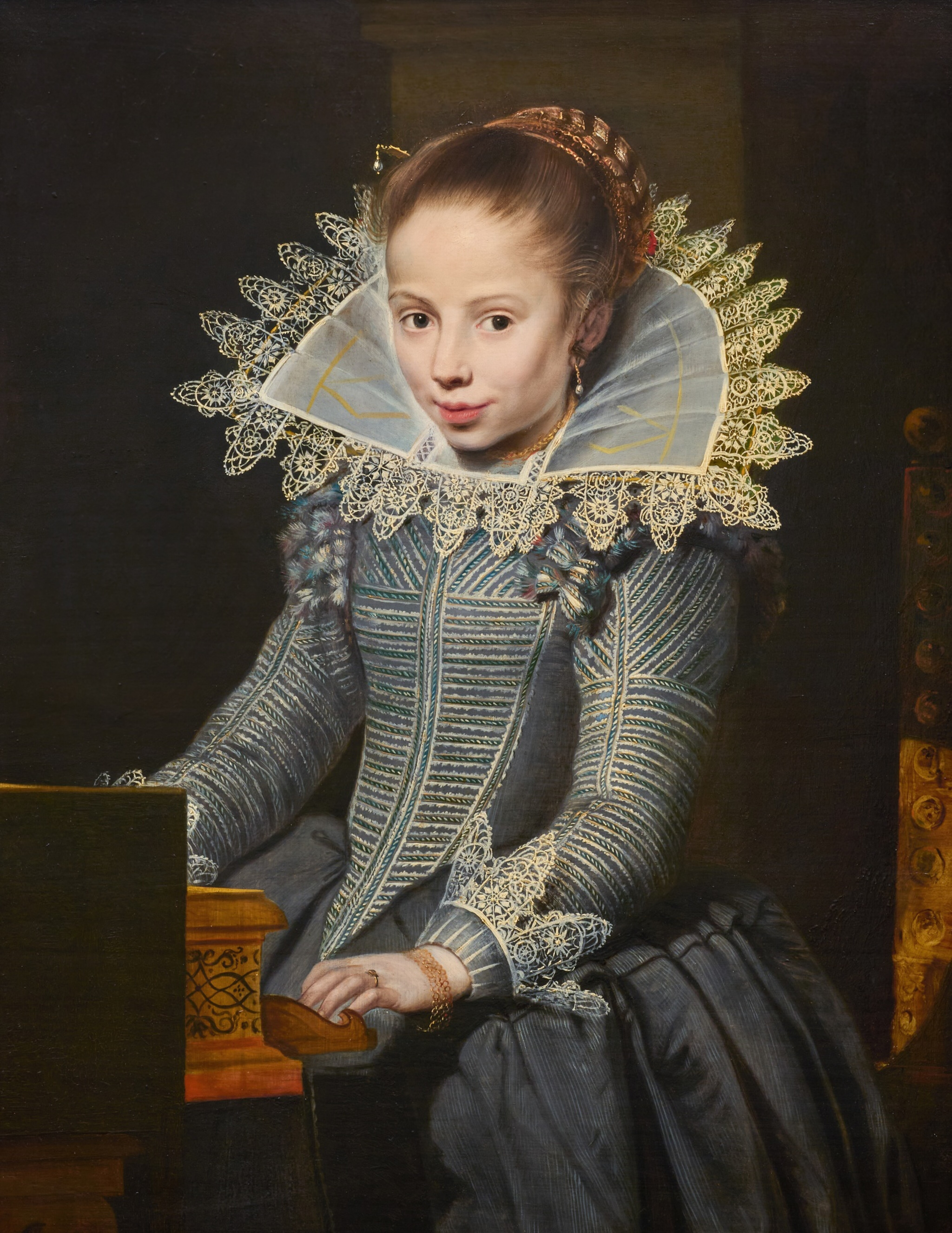
A gold-wrapped wire supportasse is visible through the sheer linen of this girl's collar. Cornelis de Vos, Young Girl at a Virginal, c. 1624–25
