= Portrait of Jan Vekemans =

1624 painting by Cornelis de Vos

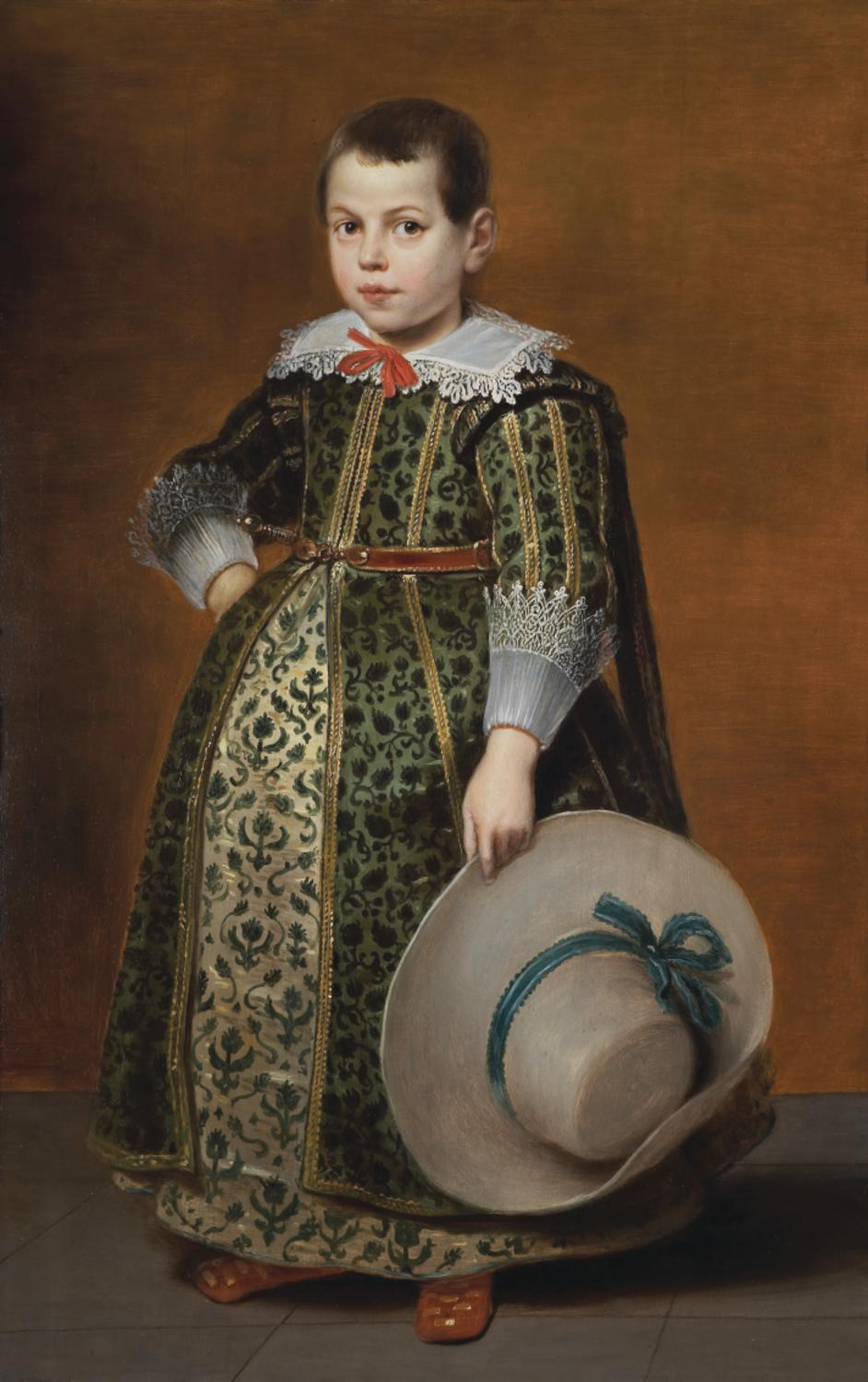
Portrait of Jan Vekemans (1624) by Cornelis de Vos

Portrait of Jan Vekemans is an unfinished 1624 oil on panel painting by Cornelis de Vos, owned by the Heritage Fund of the King Baudouin Foundation and displayed at the Museum Mayer van den Bergh, in Antwerp.

== History ==
In 1624 Joris Vekemans, a rich silk merchant based in Antwerp, commissioned a series of portraits of himself, his wife and their six children from de Vos. When Joris died the following year, only the paintings of Joris, Maria and their son Frans had been completed, with those of Frans' siblings incomplete and those of the other three children not even begun.

The Antwerp-born collector Fritz Mayer van den Bergh bought the portraits of Joris, Maria, Frans and Cornelia in 1897, but the portrait of Jan was then missing. It was rediscovered in 1986 by a British collector, who acquired it for his private collection. He learned of the existence of the other four portraits through specialist art historical publications and in 2006 offered to sell his work to the Museum Mayer van den Bergh to rejoin the other four works. However, the museum's founder had stipulated that the collection should remain exactly as it had been left to her by her dead son and so the museum was unable to accept the offer. Instead, the Heritage Fund of the King Baudouin Foundation acquired the work and placed it on permanent loan to the Museum.
