= Ruff (clothing) =

Tightly gathered collar set into formal or informal pleats

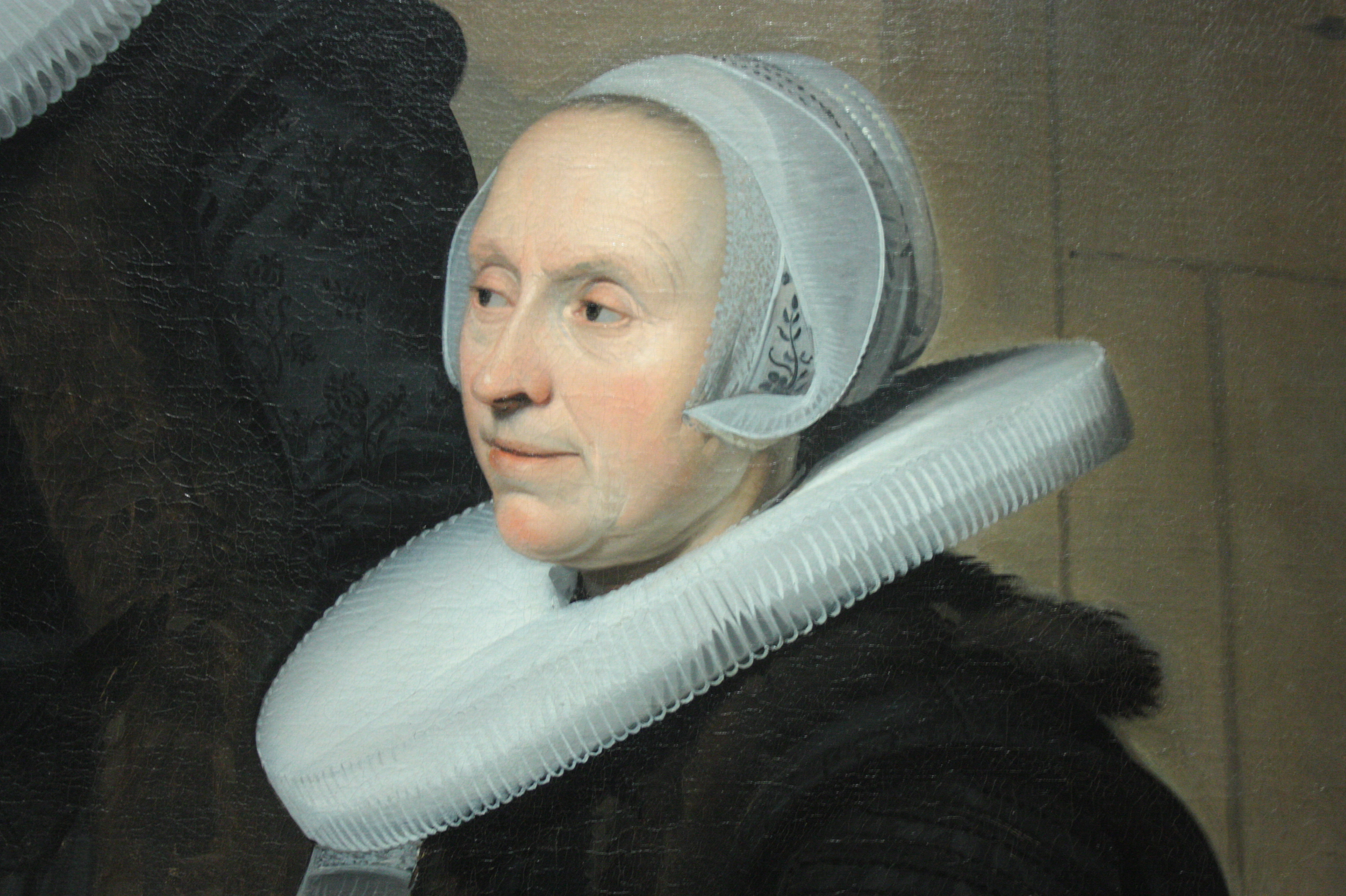
A ruff from the early 17th century: detail from The Regentesses of St Elizabeth Hospital, Haarlem, by Verspronck

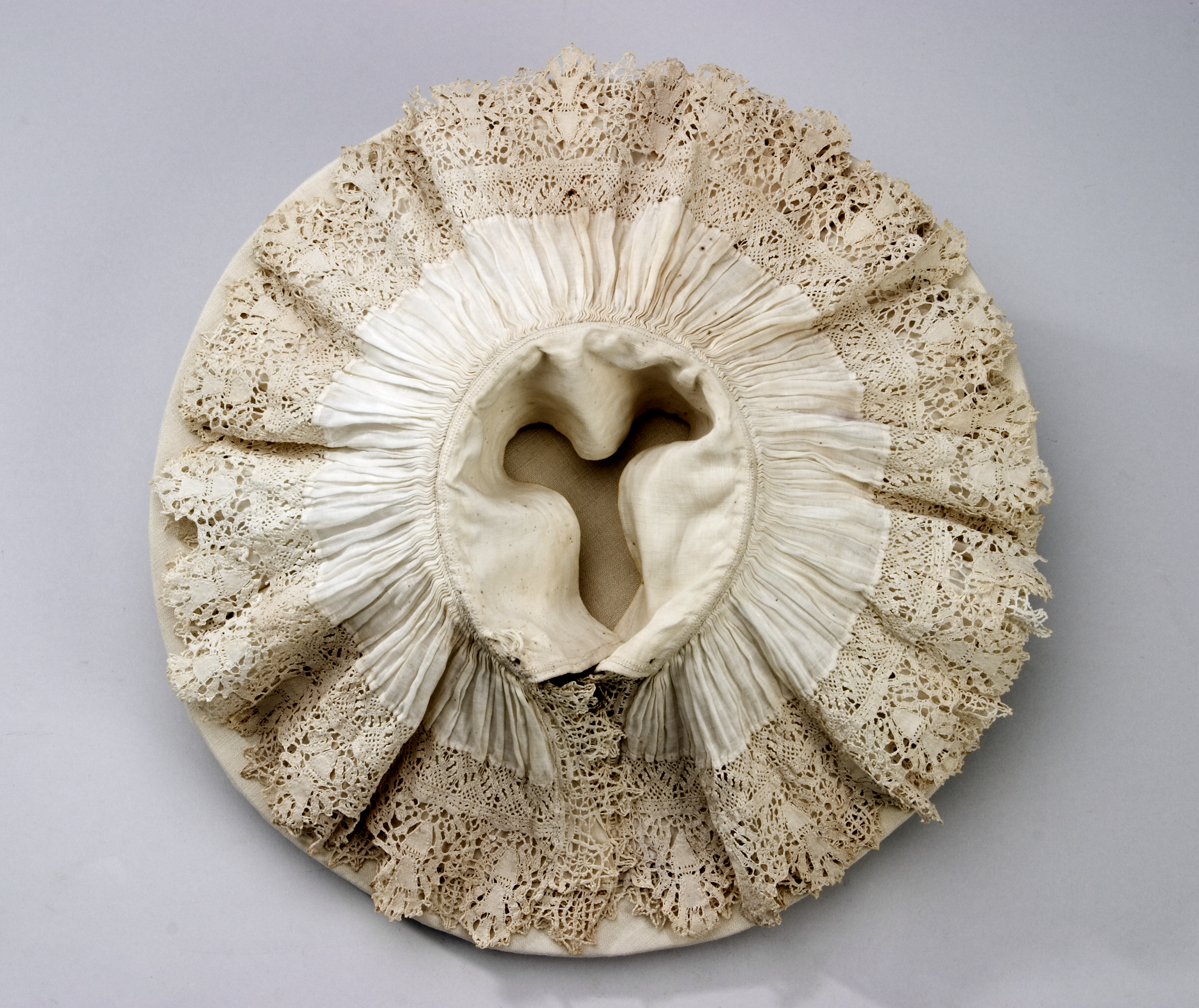
A ruff from the 1620s

A ruff is an item of clothing popular in Western, Central and Northern Europe, as well as Spanish America, from the mid-16th century to the mid-17th century. A round and flat variation is often called a millstone collar after its resemblance to millstones for grinding grain. Ruffs are still worn by Lutheran clergy in Denmark and Germany.

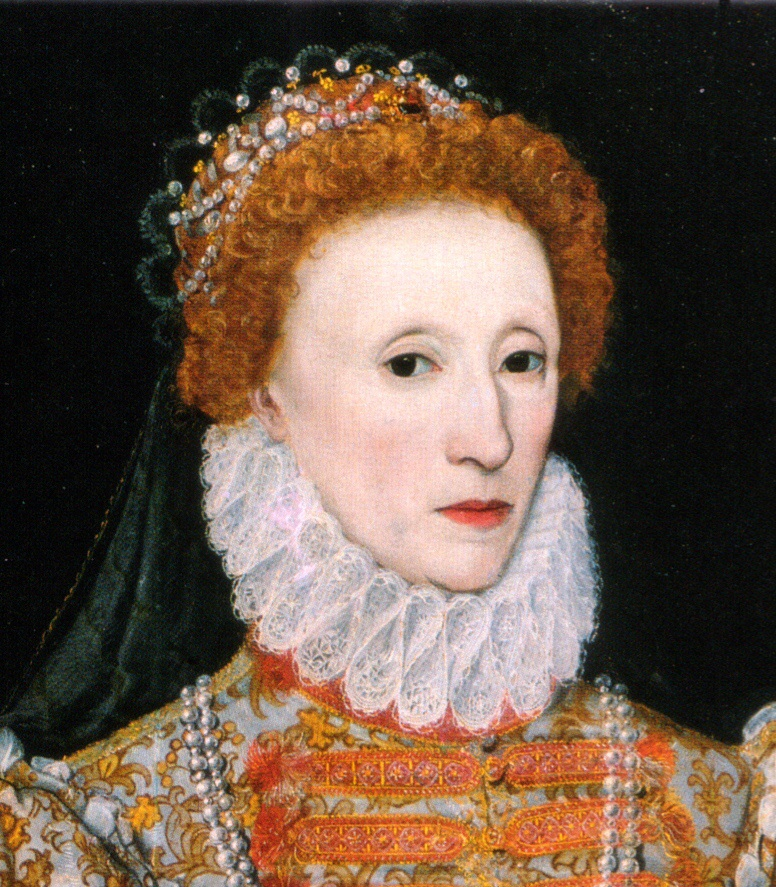
Ruff of c. 1575. Detail from the Darnley Portrait of Elizabeth I

== History ==
The ruff, which was worn by men, women and children, evolved from the small fabric ruffle at the neck of the shirt or chemise. Ruffs served as changeable pieces of cloth that could themselves be laundered separately while keeping the wearer's doublet or gown from becoming soiled at the neckline. The stiffness of the garment forced upright posture, and their impracticality led them to become a symbol of wealth and status.

Ruffs were primarily made from linen cambric, stiffened with starch imported from the Low Countries. Later ruffs were sometimes made entirely from lace, an expensive embellishment that developed in the early sixteenth century.

The size of the ruff increased as the century went on. "Ten yards is enough for the ruffs of the neck and hand" for a New Year's gift made by her ladies for Elizabeth I of England in 1565, but the adoption of starch allowed ruffs to be made wider without losing their shape. Later ruffs were separate garments that could be washed, starched, and set into elaborate figure-of-eight folds by the use of heated, cone-shaped goffering irons. At their most extreme, "cartwheel ruffs" were a foot or more wide; these cartwheel ruffs required a wire frame called a supportasse or underpropper to hold them at the fashionable angle.

By the start of the seventeenth century, ruffs were falling out of fashion in Western Europe, in favour of wing collars and falling bands. The fashion lingered longer in the Dutch Republic, where ruffs can be seen in portraits well into the seventeenth century, as well as in other places. The ruff remained part of the ceremonial dress of city councillors (Senatoren) in the cities of the Hanseatic league and of Lutheran clergy in Denmark, Norway, the Faroe Islands, Iceland, and Greenland.

The ruff was banned by Philip IV of Spain in 1621 in a symbolic attempt to reduce the inertia and power of the conservative Spanish elite.

=== Today ===
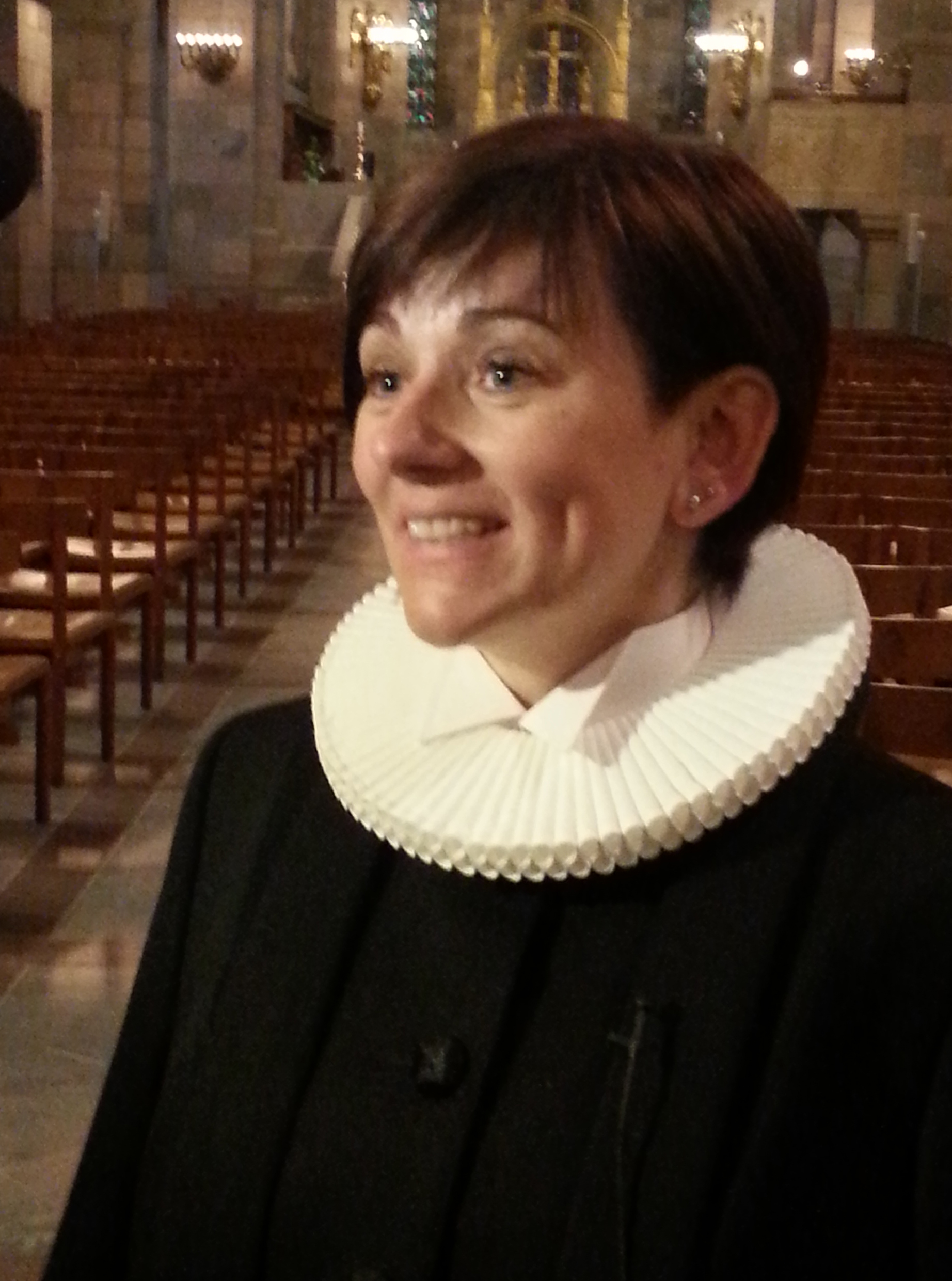
A priest of the Church of Denmark wearing a ruff (2015)

Ruffs remain part of the formal attire of bishops and other clergy in the Church of Denmark, the Church of the Faroe Islands and some districts of the Evangelical Lutheran Church in Northern Germany. The Church of Norway removed the ruff from its clergy uniform in 1980, although some conservative priests, such as Børre Knudsen, continued to wear them. Ruffs are also worn by boy sopranos in some Anglican church choirs.

== Colours ==
The most popular and basic colour for ruffs was white, but sometimes the starch used to stiffen the ruff was enhanced with dyes, giving ruffs a range of pastel shades that washed away along with the starch. Dyes of vegetable origin made ruffs pink, light purple, yellow, or green. Light purple could also be achieved using cochineal. Yellow could come from saffron, and pale blue from smalt.

The bluish tint of a ruff was supposed to make the wearer's complexion appear paler, thus more attractive to contemporaries. Elizabeth I took against this colour and issued a royal prerogative: "Her Majesty's pleasure is that no blue starch shall be used or worn by any of her Majesty's subjects, since blue was the colour of the flag of Scotland ...".

Of the dyed ruffs, those in yellow were the most popular throughout Europe. In England, yellow went out of fashion after the trial and execution of convicted murderer Anna Turner, who was considered the inventor of yellow starch. During her trial the yellow-dyed ruffs started to be seen as a symbol of declining morality. According to some of Anne's contemporaries, she wore a yellow ruff to her trial, after which the executioner ironically decided to wear the same colour to carry out her sentence. However, this may only be a rumour of the time, as there are other primary sources that do not mention this detail.

Coloured ruffs are rarely seen in portraits not only because they were overall less popular than the white ones, but also because later restorers repainted them, believing white to be the "correct" colour for ruffs.

Coloured ruffs:

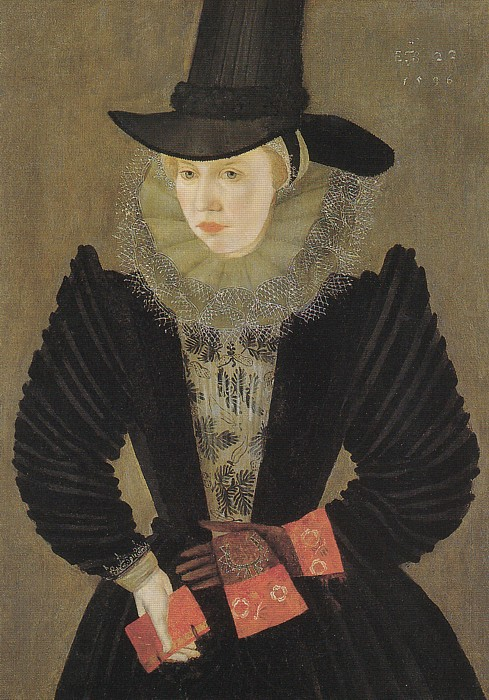
Joan Alleyn wearing a green ruff trimmed with lace, England, 1596.

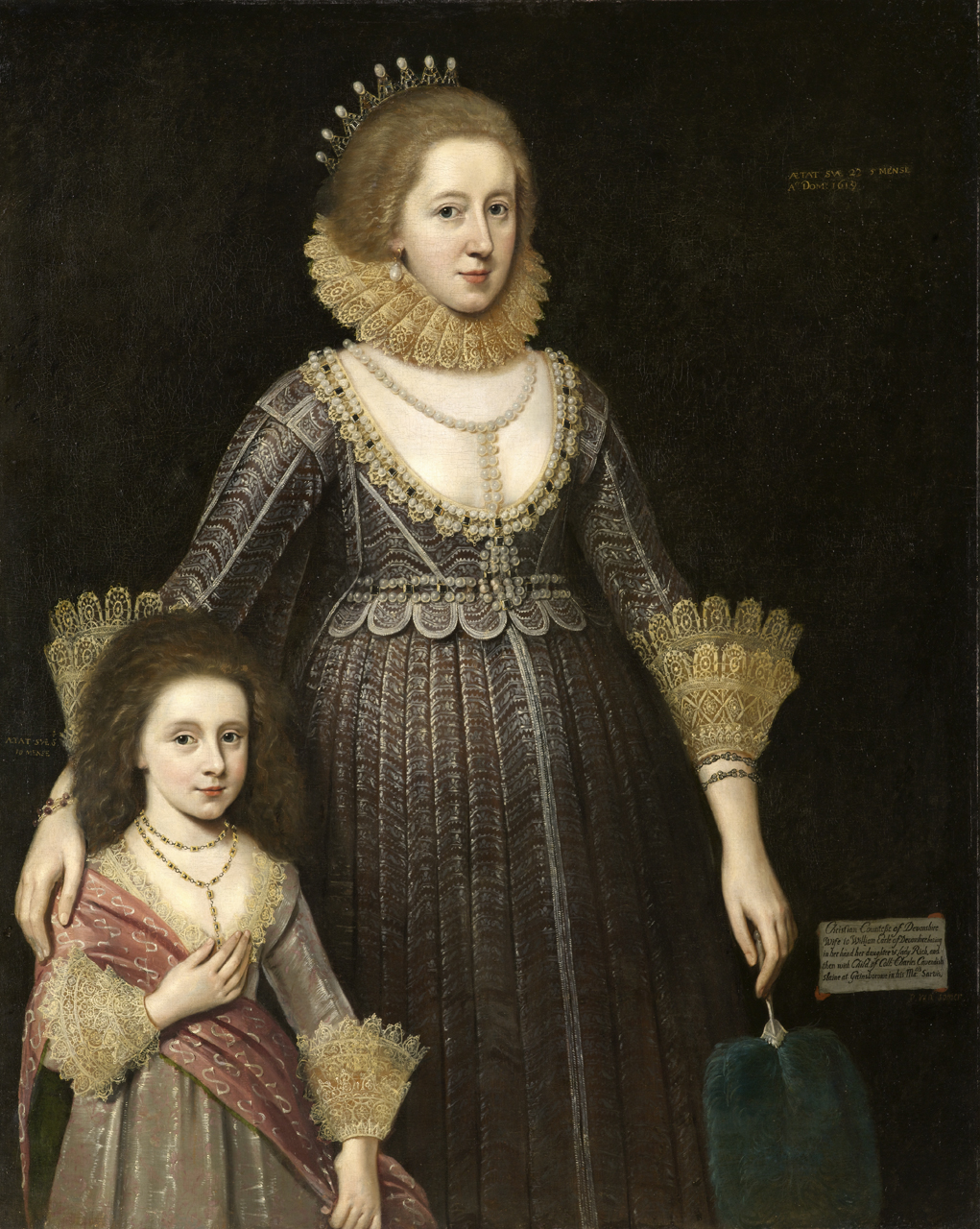
Christian Cavendish, Countess of Devonshire wearing a saffron yellow lace ruff, 1619.

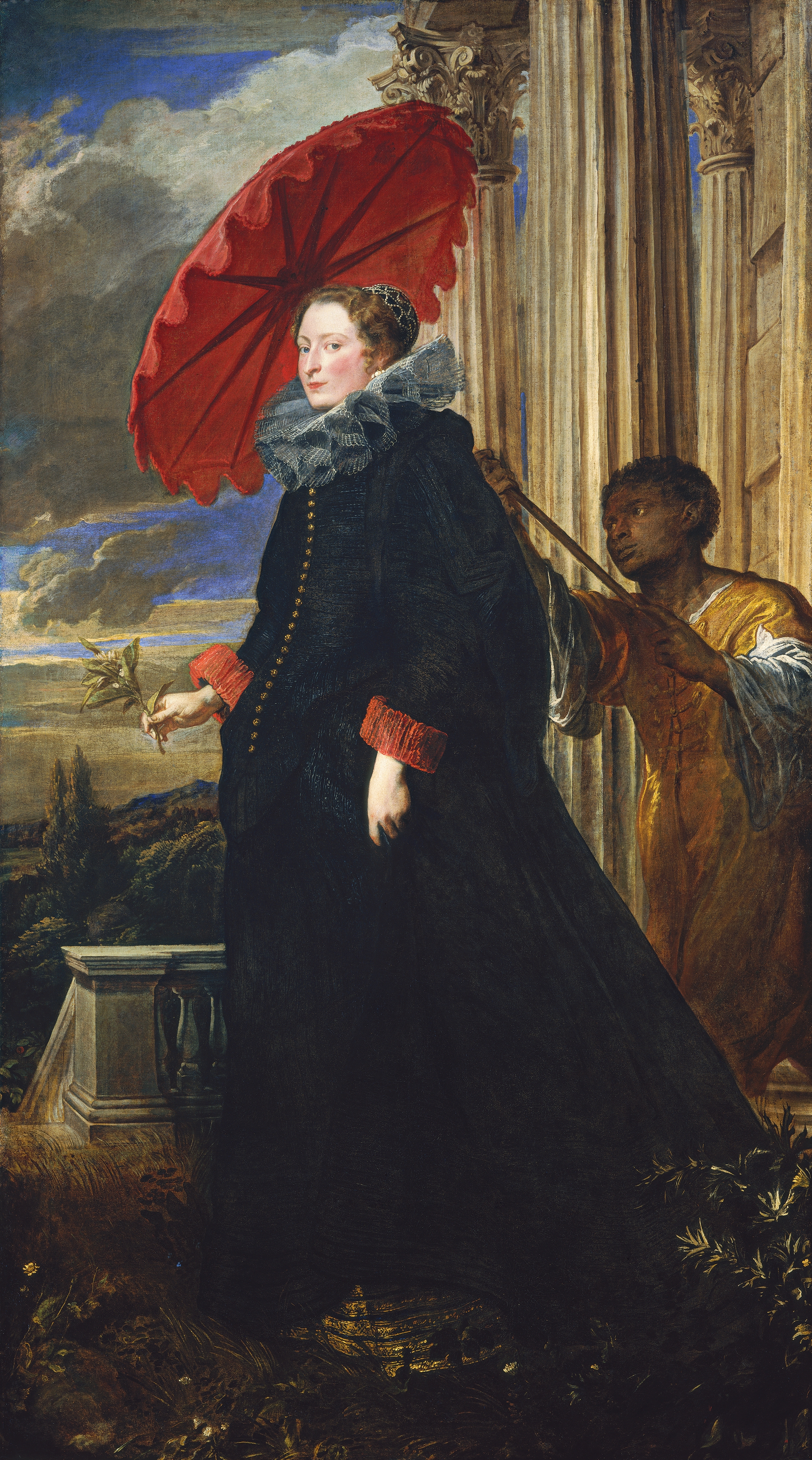
Marchesa Elena Grimaldi Cattaneo wearing a blue ruff, 1623.

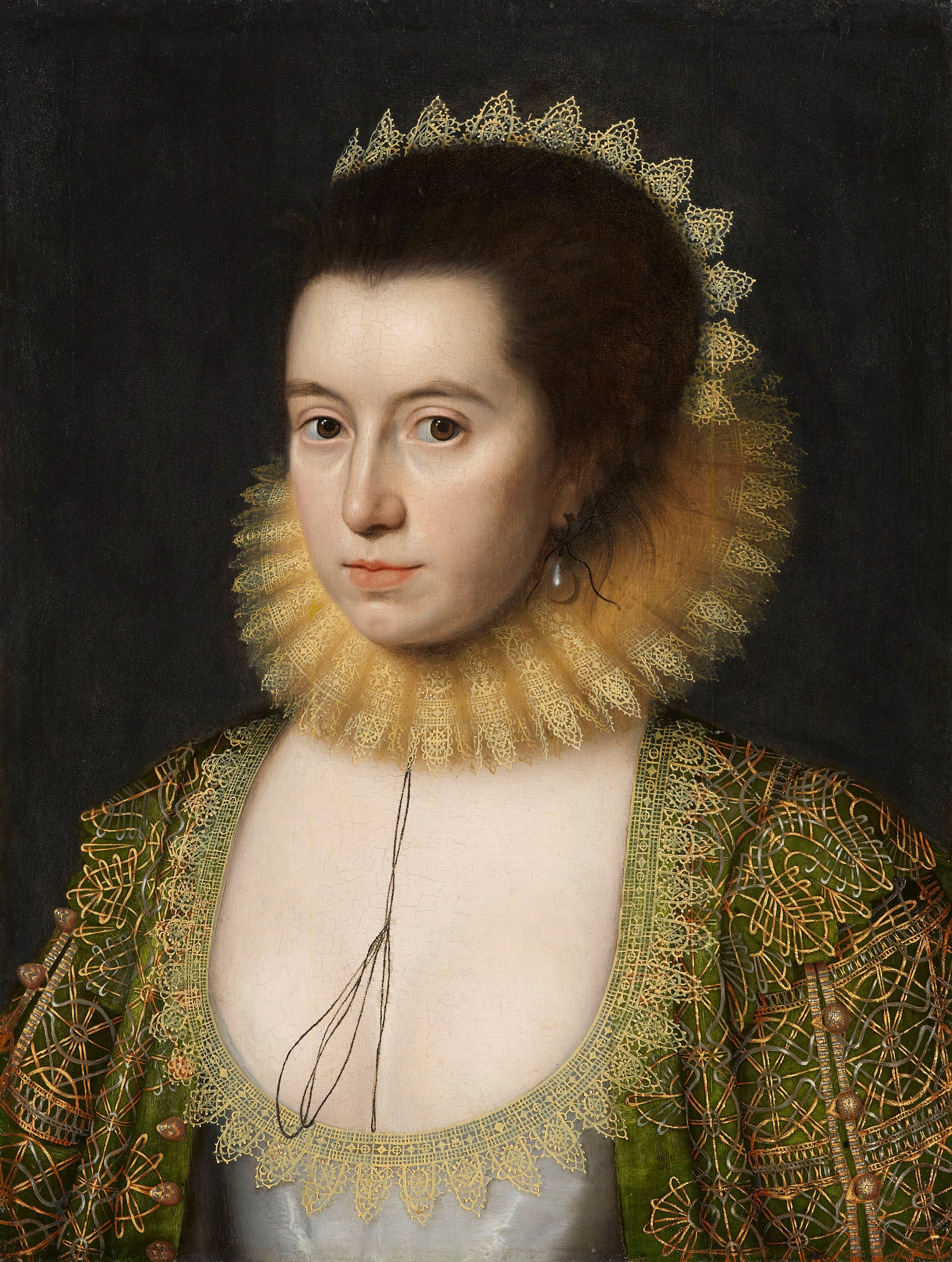
Lady Anne Clifford wearing a saffron yellow ruff, 1618.

== Gallery ==
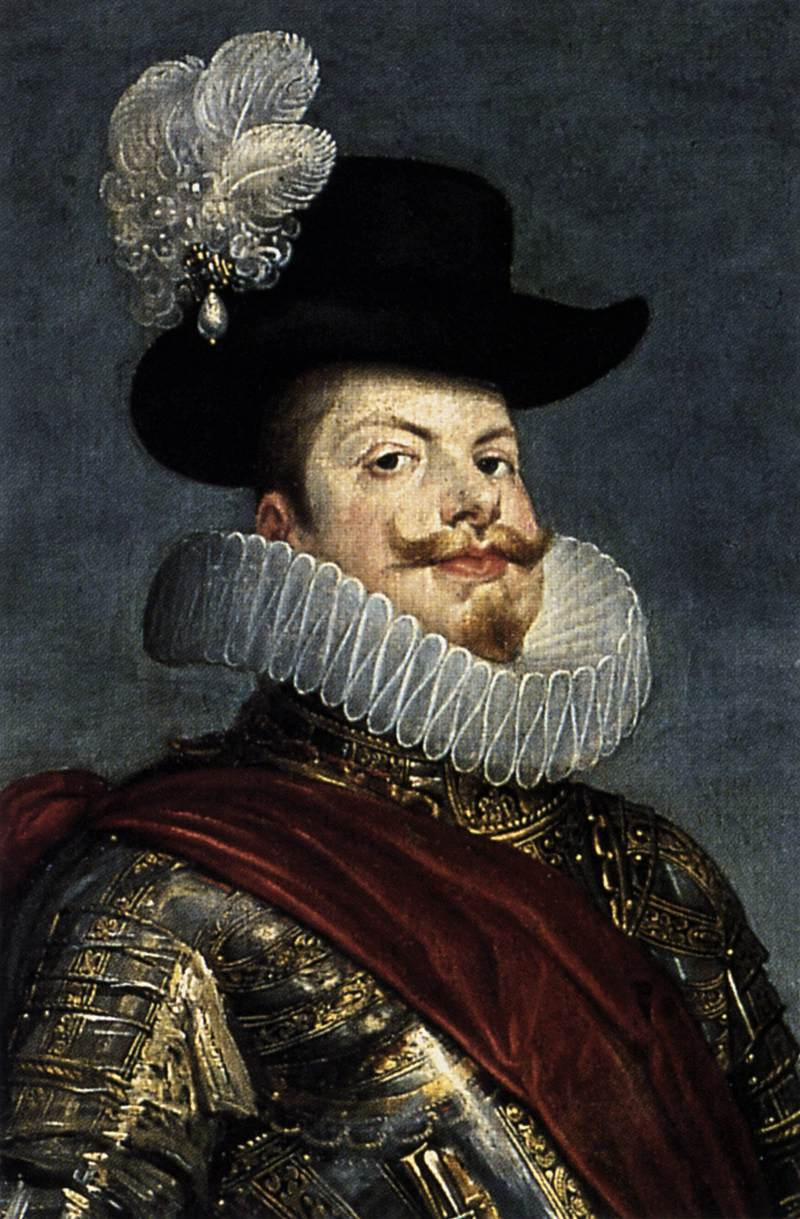
Philip III of Spain c. 1615. Detail from a portrait by Velázquez

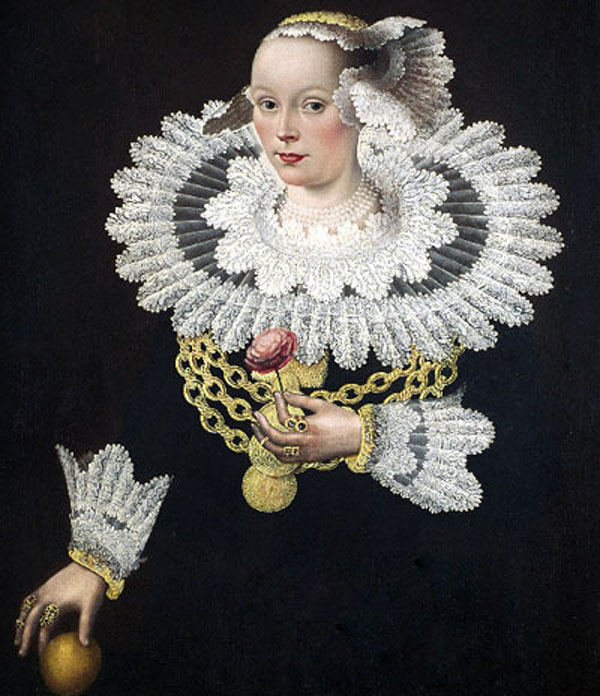
The wife of the burgomaster of Lübeck, 1642

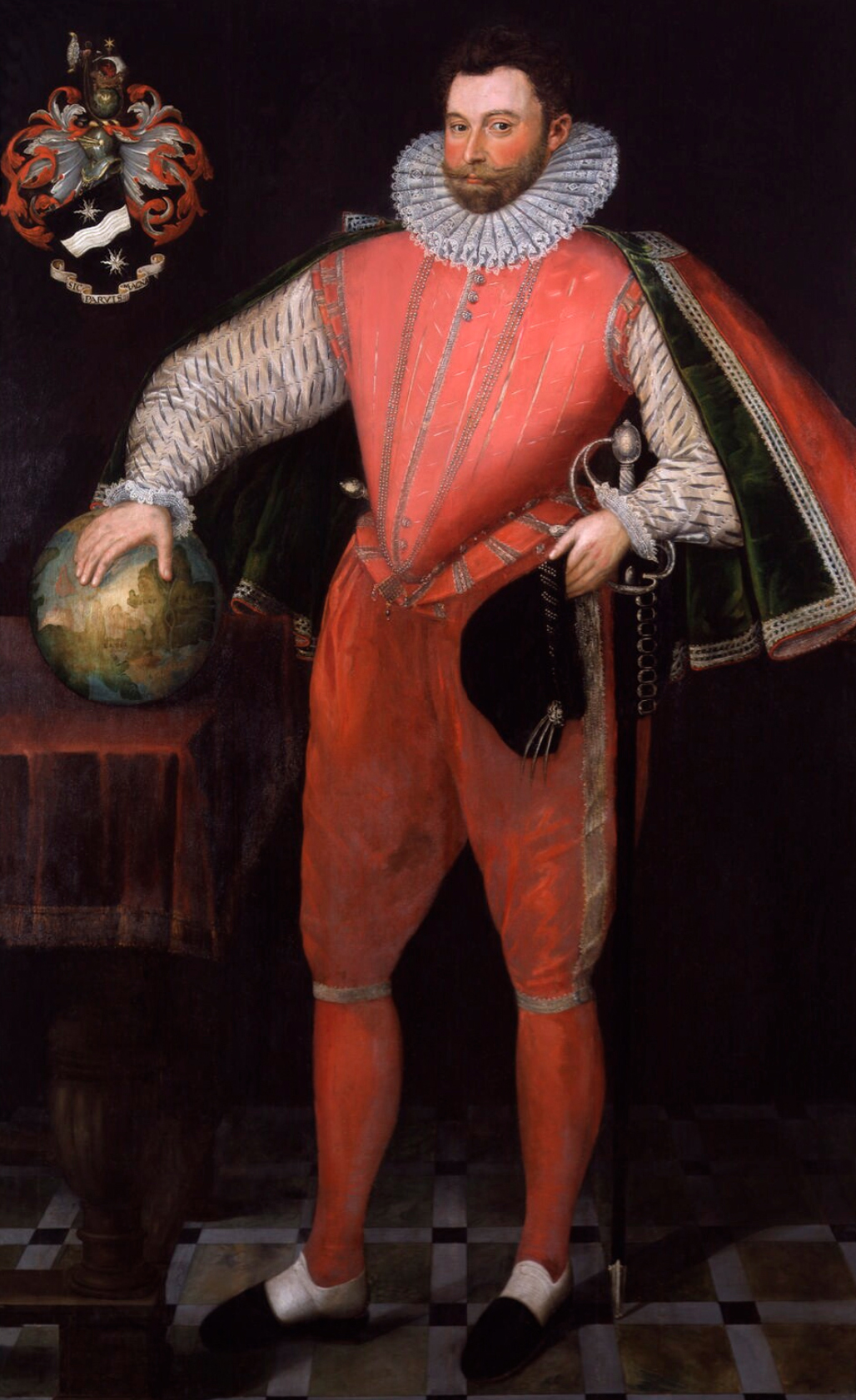
Sir Francis Drake

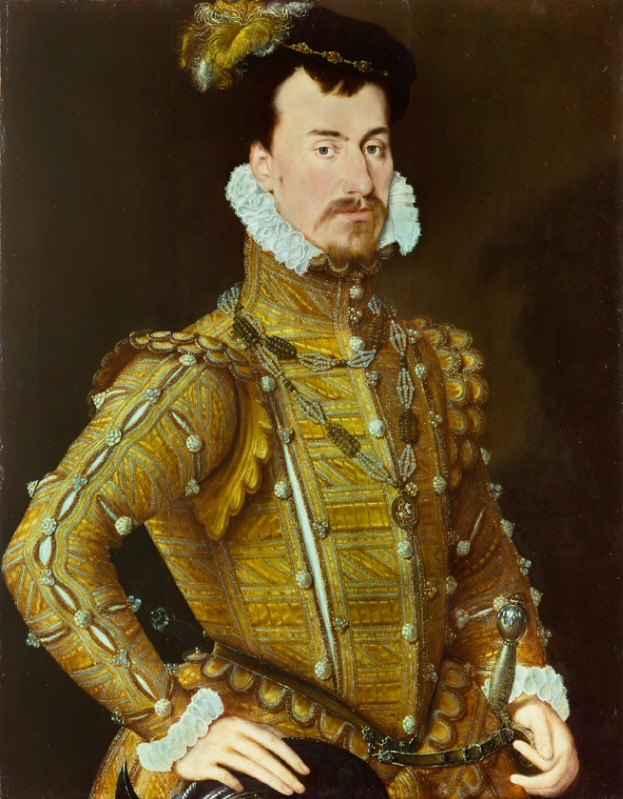
Robert Dudley, 1st Earl of Leicester

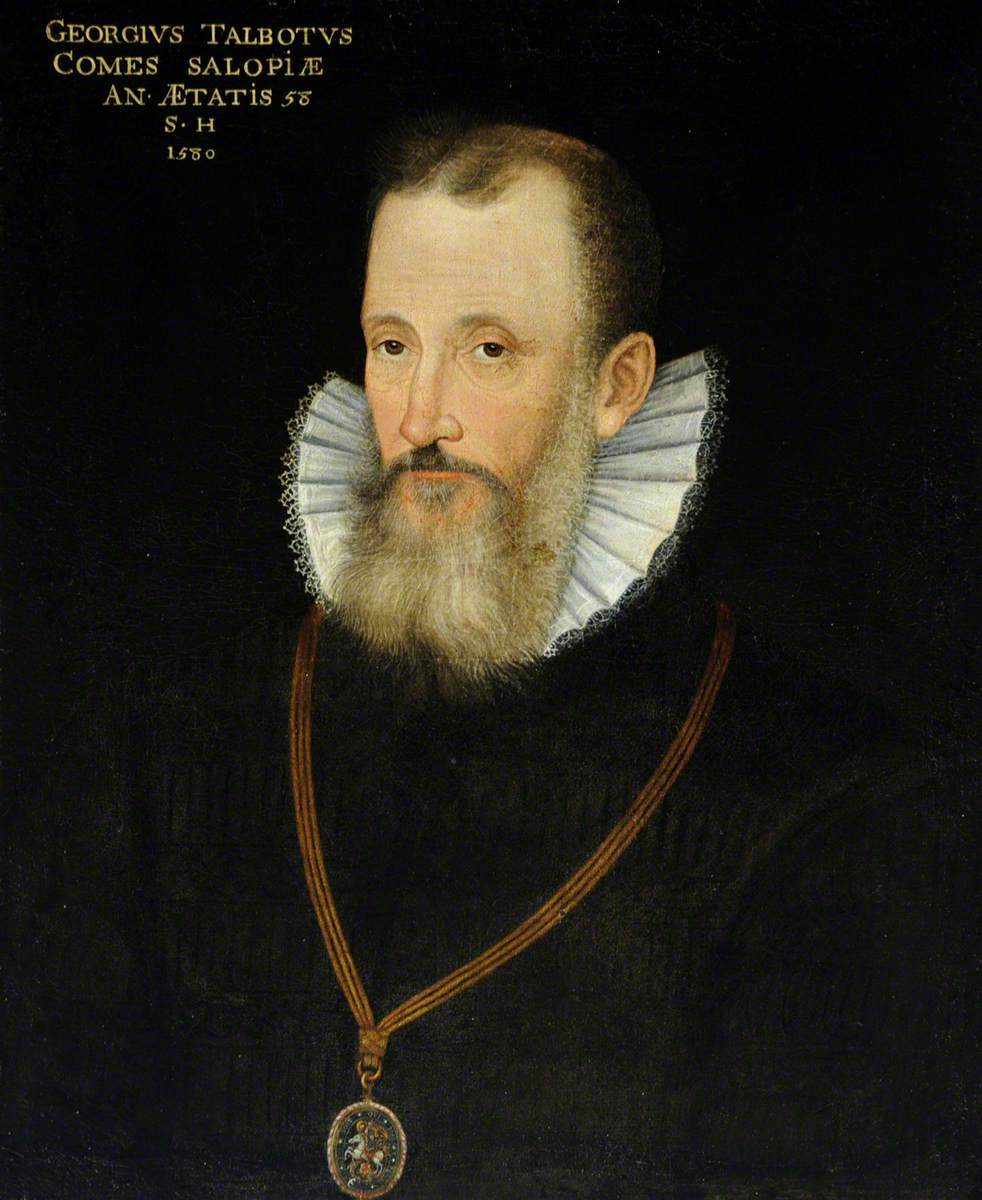
George Talbot, 6th Earl of Shrewsbury

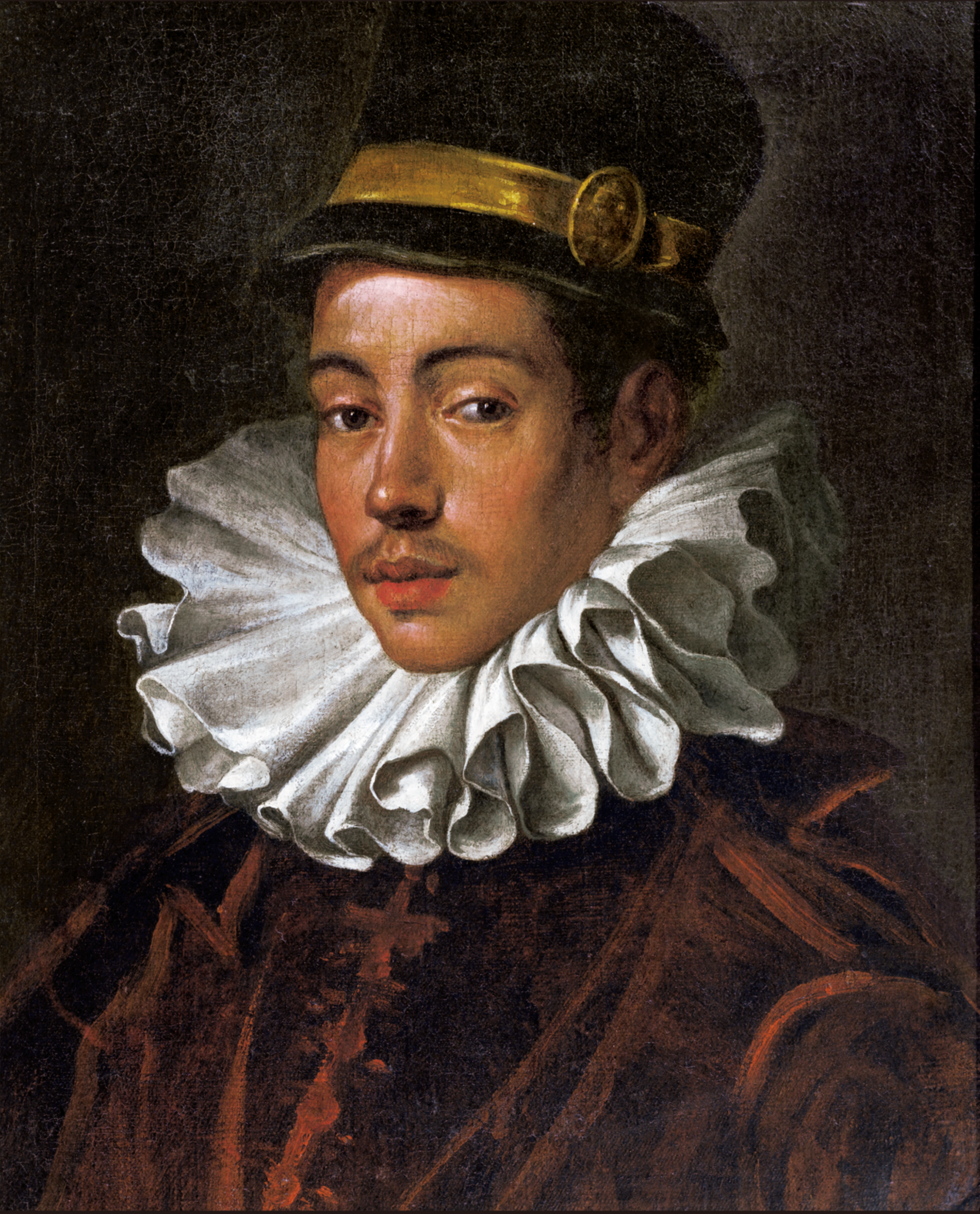
Itō Mancio, 1585

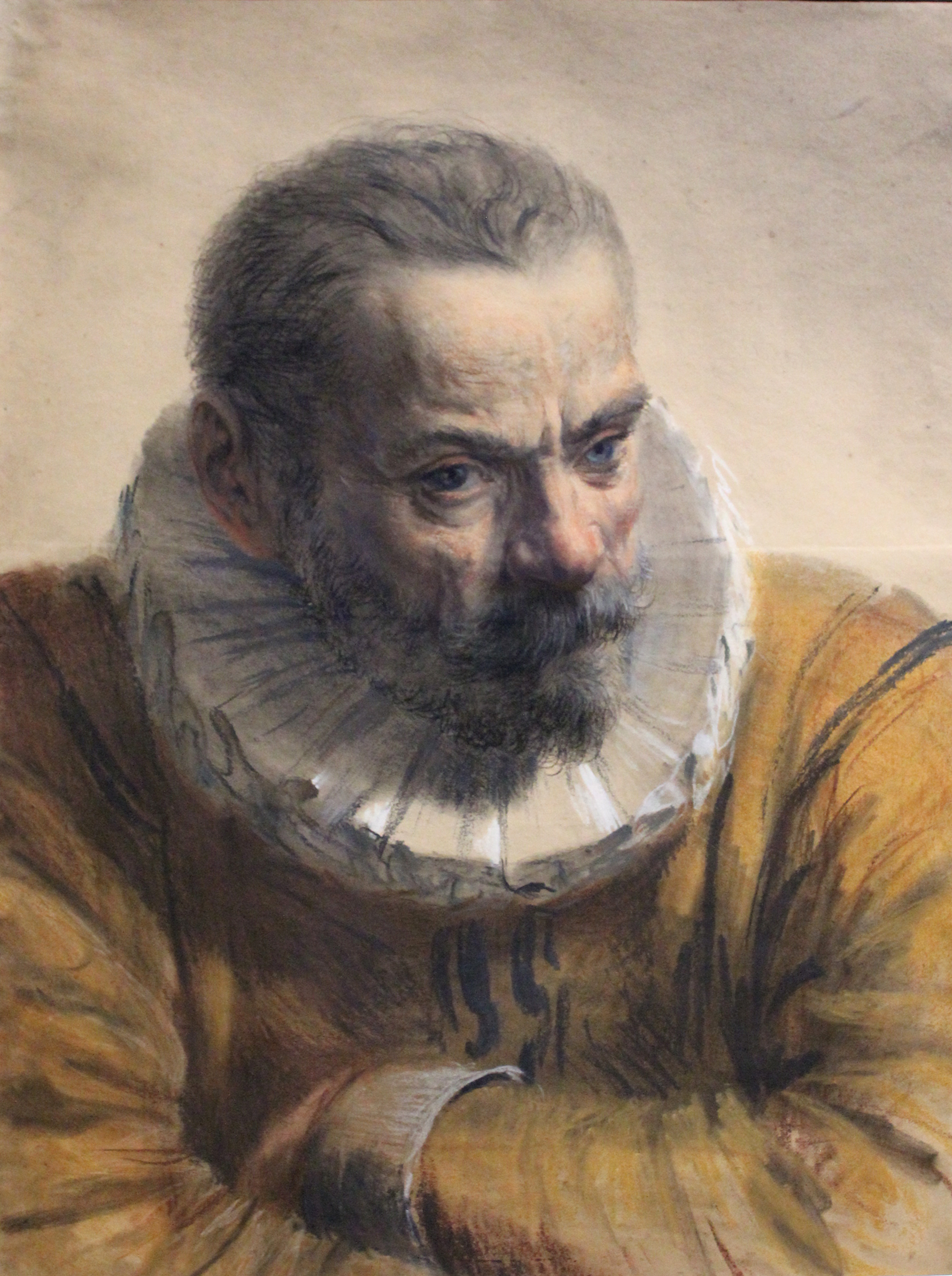
Study of a Man with a Ruff Collar by Adolph Menzel, ca 1850

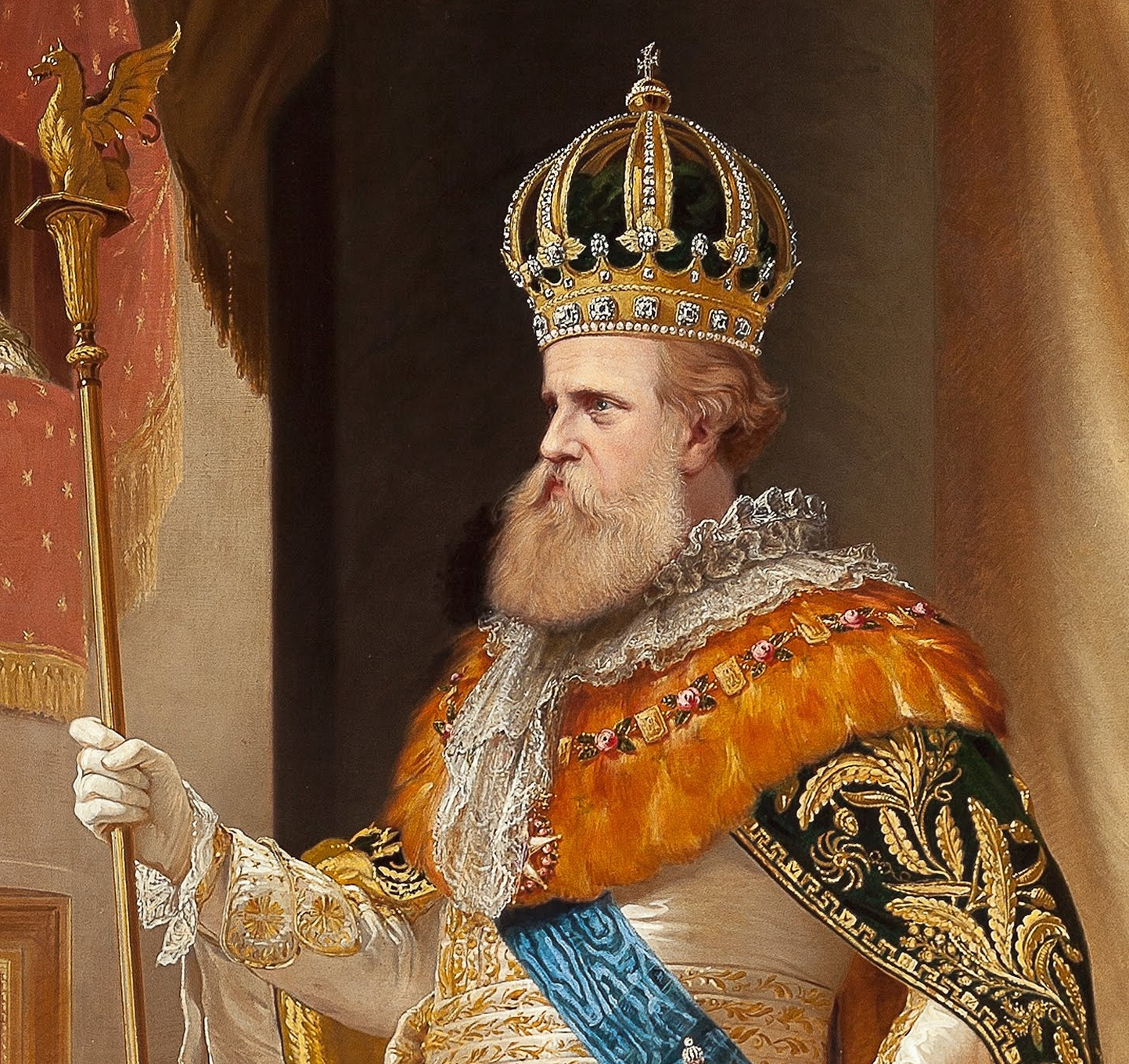
Pedro II of Brazil, 1872. Detail from a portrait by Pedro Américo

== See also ==
- 1550–1600 in Western European fashion
- 1600–1650 in Western European fashion
- Piccadill, a similar clothing fashion
- Collar (clothing)
