= Cornelius Grapheus =

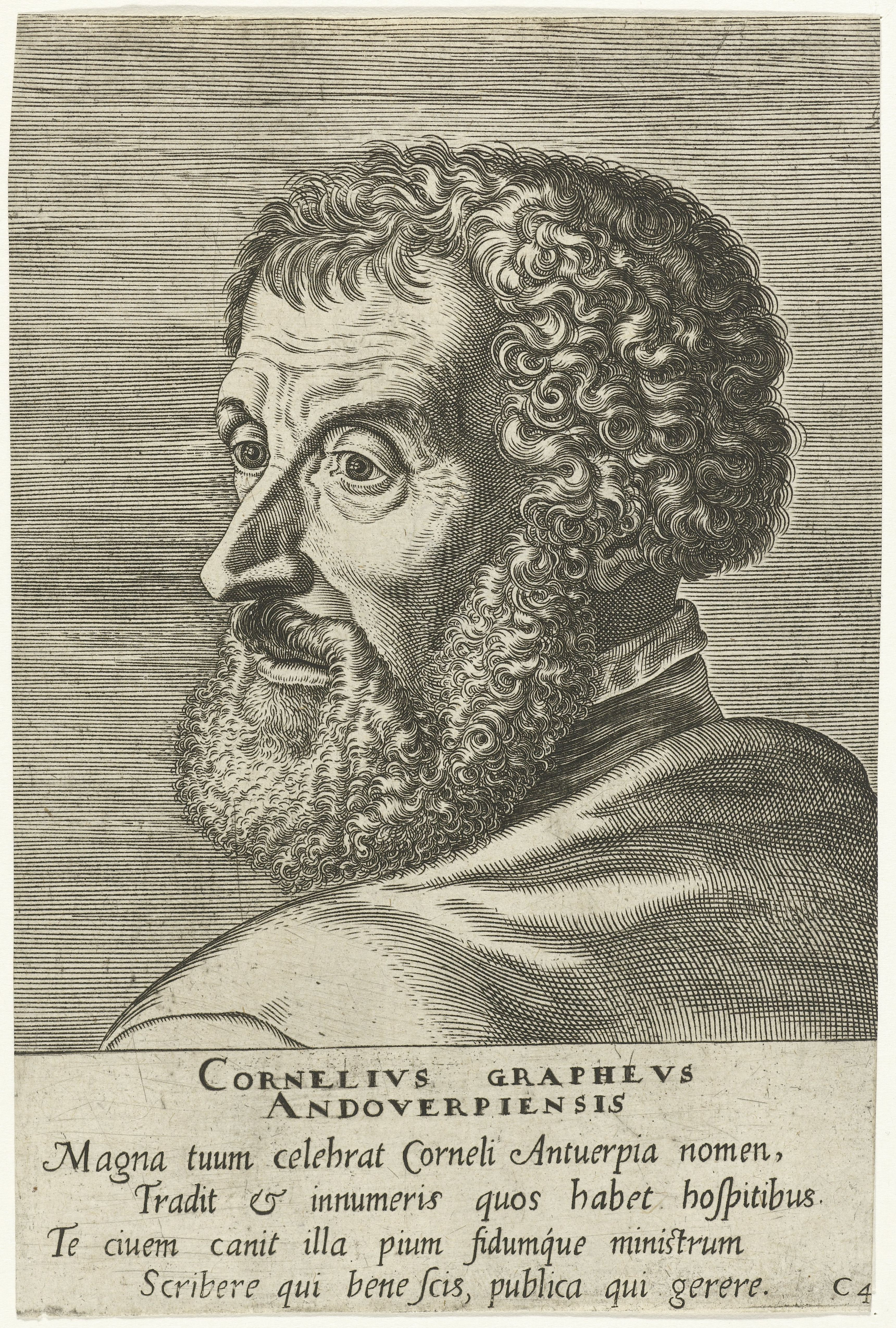
- Portrait of Cornelius Grapheus engraved by Philip Galle (1572)
- Born: Cornelis De Schrijver; 1482; Aalst, County of Flanders, Habsburg Netherlands
- Died: 19 December 1558 (aged 75–76); Antwerp, Duchy of Brabant, Spanish Netherlands
- Occupation: secretary to the city of Antwerp
- Spouse: Adrienne Philips
- Writing career
- Language: Dutch
- Period: Renaissance

Cornelius Grapheus (1482 – 19 December 1558), Latinized from Cornelis De Schrijver, was a secretary to the city of Antwerp and writer.

== Life ==
Grapheus was born in Aalst, County of Flanders, in 1482. His brother was Joannes Grapheus, the printer who also settled in Antwerp. As a young man Cornelius travelled in Italy. When Thomas More's Utopia was first printed in 1516, Grapheus provided some liminary verses.

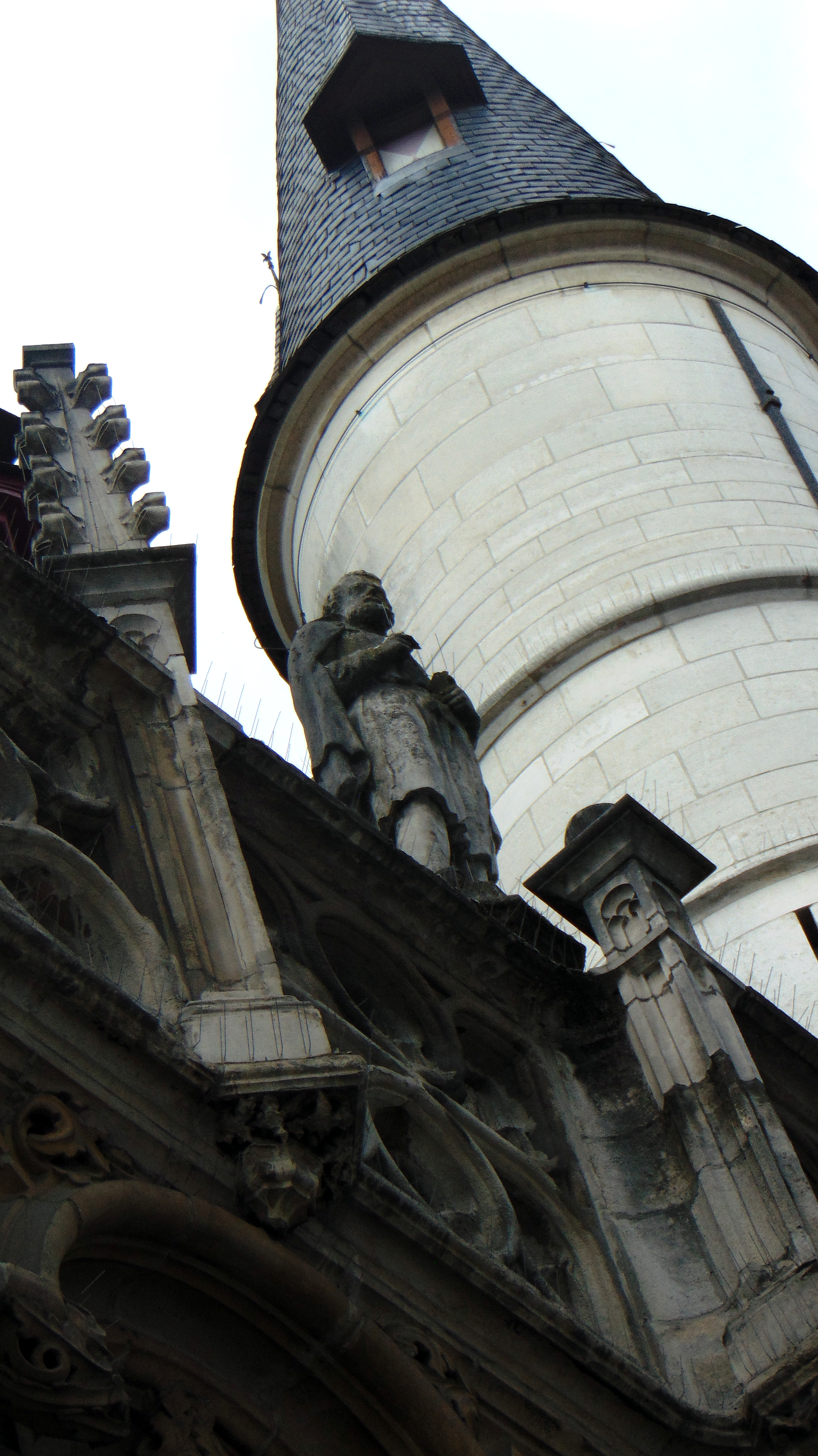
Statue of Cornelius Grapheus, on the gebiedshuisje nearby the Belfry of Aalst.

By 1520 he was secretary to the city of Antwerp, writing a Latin panegyric to greet Charles V on his return to that city from Spain. In 1522 he was arrested on accusation of heresy, was taken to Brussels for questioning, and made a full recantation. In 1523 he was set at liberty and returned to Antwerp, where he became a teacher. In 1540 he was reinstated as secretary to the city, and in 1549 he was again involved in the public welcome of a visiting prince, in this case Philip II of Spain. He died in Antwerp on 19 December 1558.

== Works ==
- Divi Caroli imp. caes. opt. max. desyderatissimus ex Hispania in Germaniam reditus (Antwerp, Michiel Hillen van Hoochstraten, 1520). Available on Google Books.
- Ex Publii Terentii comoediis latinissime colloquiorum formulae (Vienna, 1529). Available on Google Books.
  - Reprinted Mainz, 1537 – available on Google Books.
- Spectaculorum in susceptione Philippi (Antwerp, Gillis Coppens van Diest for Pieter Coecke van Aelst, 1550). Available on Internet Archive.
  - Dutch translation as De seer wonderlijcke, schoone, triumphelijcke incompst, van den hooghmogenden Prince Philips (Antwerp, Gillis Coppens van Diest for Pieter Coecke van Aelst, 1550). Available on Google Books.
  - French translation as Le Triumphe d'Anvers, faict en la susception du Prince Philips (Antwerp, 1550). Available on Google Books.
