= Joannes Grapheus =

Printer based in Antwerp (1502–1571)

Joannes Grapheus (1502, Alost - 1571) was an early printer based in Antwerp.

His brother was Cornelis Scribonius Grapheus the Antwerp city clerk. He married Elisabeth Van Amersfoort, daughter of Gerhard Amersfoort. Her sisters married Franz Birckmann and John Siberch.
