= Portrait of Abraham Grapheus =

1620 painting by Cornelis de Vos

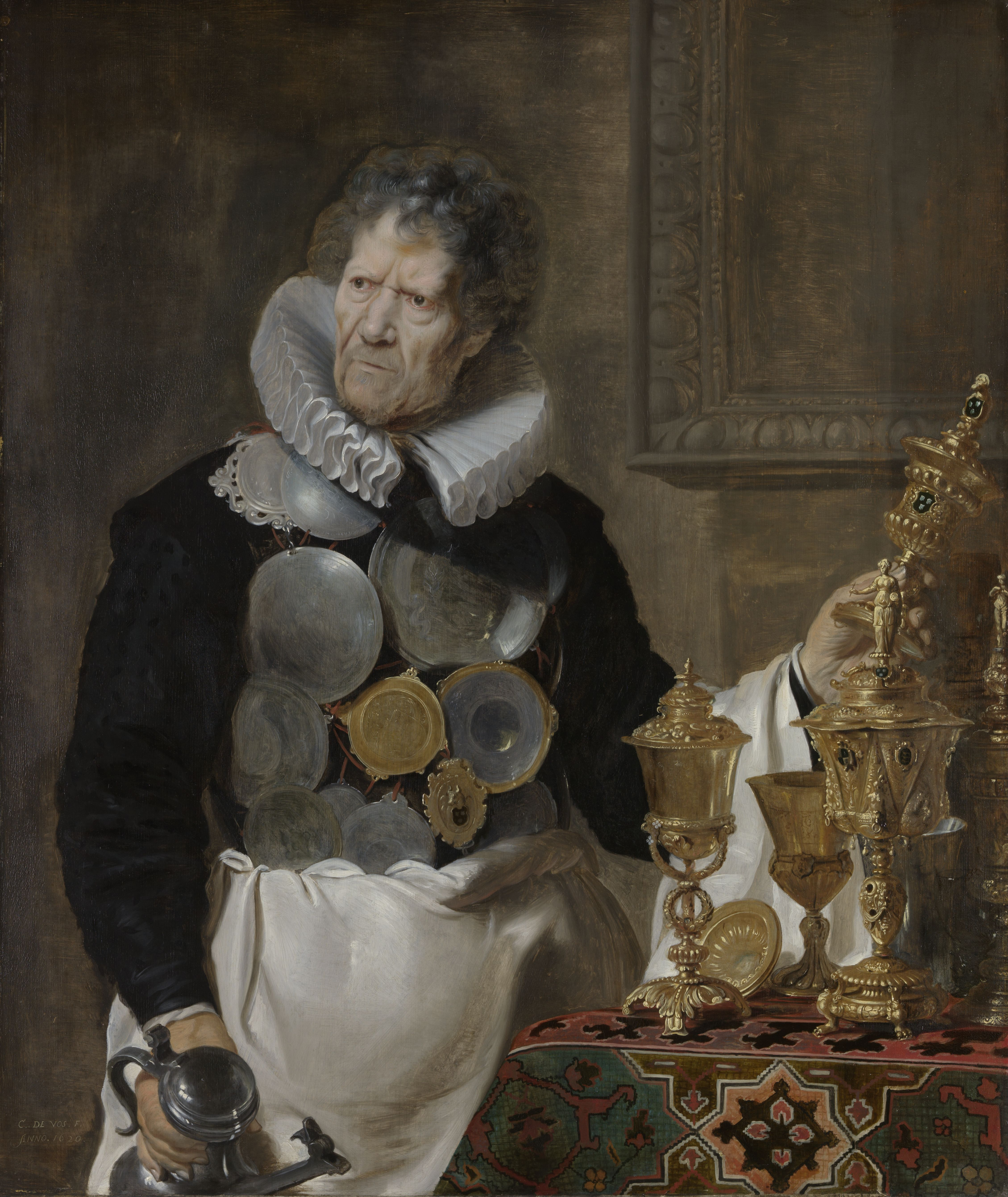
Portrait of Abraham Grapheus (1620) by Cornelis de Vos

Portrait of Abraham Grapheus is a 1620 oil painting on panel by Cornelis de Vos, now in the Royal Museum of Fine Arts, Antwerp. Its subject was a fellow member of Antwerp's Guild of St. Luke, of which de Vos was then dean. The work was taken to Paris by the French occupiers of the Southern Netherlands between 1794 and 1796. It returned to Antwerp in 1815, where it hung in the Antwerp Academy.

Grapheus wears a set of silver plates, normally worn by the guild's head, one of which bears the ox's head, a symbol of saint Luke. In his left hand he holds a chalice showing Apelles, Zeuxis, Raphael and Albrecht Dürer, important role models for members of the guild, with an ox's head on the lid. The right hand cup in the foreground shows a personification of painting as a woman - this was commissioned by Cornelis van der Geest and other notable figures in Antwerp life to a design by Sebastiaan Vrancx (1612).
