= Cornelis de Vos =

17th-century Flemish painter

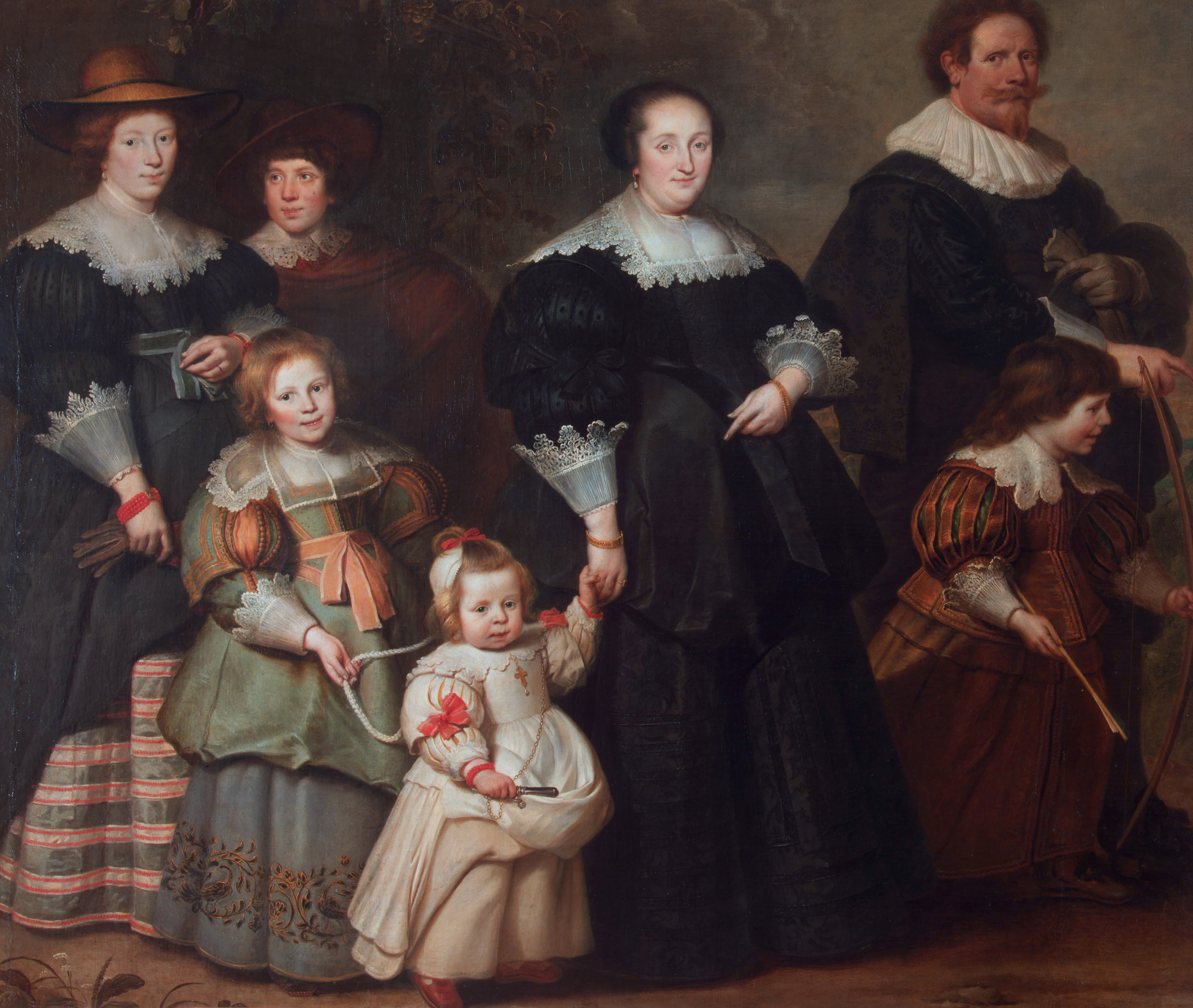
- Self-portrait of the artist and his family
- Born: 1584; Hulst, near Antwerp, Southern Netherlands
- Died: 9 May 1651 (aged 66–67); Antwerp, Habsburg Netherlands
- Known for: Painting, draughtsman, art dealer

Cornelis de Vos (1584 - 9 May 1651) was a Flemish painter, draughtsman and art dealer. He was one of the leading portrait painters in Antwerp and is best known for his sensitive portraits, in particular of children and families. He was also successful in other genres including history, religious and genre painting. He was a regular collaborator with Rubens.

== Life ==
He was born in Hulst near Antwerp, now in the Dutch province of Zeeland. Little is known of his childhood. His father moved with his family to Antwerp in 1596. Cornelis and his younger brothers Paul and Jan (or Hans) studied under the little-known painter David Remeeus (1559–1626). In 1599 de Vos is mentioned as Remeeus' pupil while on 8 May 1604 he is referred to as the chief assistant of Remeeus. On 29 April 1604, de Vos petitioned the Antwerp City Council for a pass that would allow him to travel. This was a necessary procedure for artists who wished to be trained abroad. It is not known whether the young artist actually left the city to study abroad. De Vos joined the Guild of Saint Luke in 1608 at the age of 24. When he became a citizen of Antwerp in 1616 he listed his occupation as an art dealer.

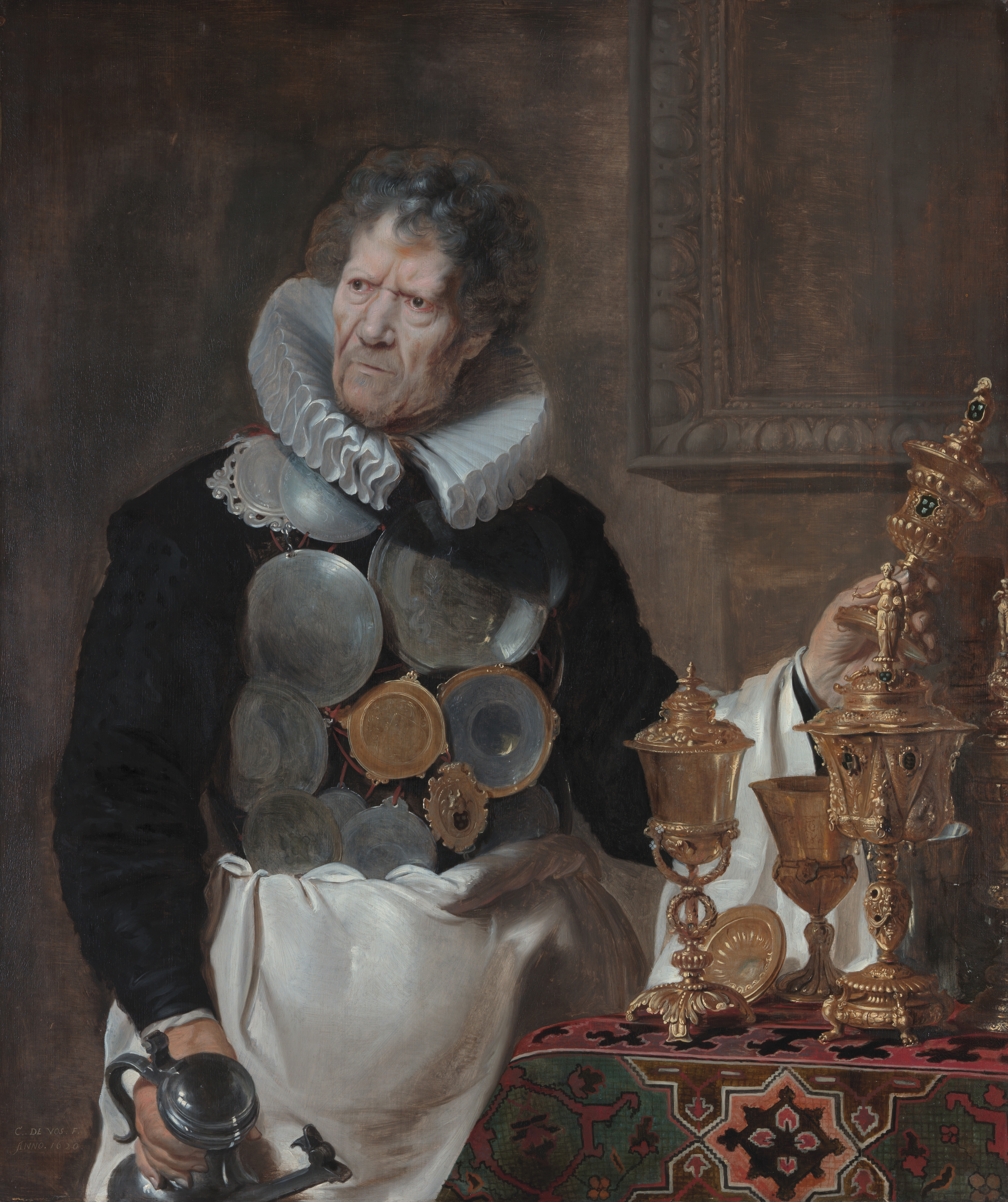
Portrait of Abraham Grapheus

Cornelis de Vos married the landscape painter Jan Wildens's half-sister Susanna Cock on 27 May 1617. The couple had 6 children. His sister Margaretha married the prominent animal painter Frans Snyders. These marriages confirmed and solidified de Vos' role in Antwerp's artistic life.

In 1619 de Vos served as the dean of the Guild of Saint Luke in Antwerp. The same year he petitioned the Antwerp city council for permission to frequent the Saint-Germain market in Paris as an art dealer. In 1620 de Vos was elected high dean of the Guild of Saint Luke in recognition of his status in the city.

De Vos developed a busy practice as a painter, particularly of portraits. In 1620 he painted the portrait of the painter Abraham Grapheus (Royal Museum of Fine Arts Antwerp). He donated the work to the painters' chamber of the Guild of Saint Luke. De Vos received multiple commissions for family portraits from local patrons such as the wealthy merchant Joris Vekemans who ordered a portrait cycle of his family members (including his son Jan) in 1624. In 1627 he enjoyed royal patronage when 6 royal portraits were commissioned by respectively Philip IV of Spain, the Archdukes Albert and Isabella, Henri III of France, Henry IV of France and Marie de' Medici. He also worked on commissions from religious institutions. In 1628 he painted his only known landscape, a View of Hulst, which he donated to his home town where it is still displayed in the city hall.

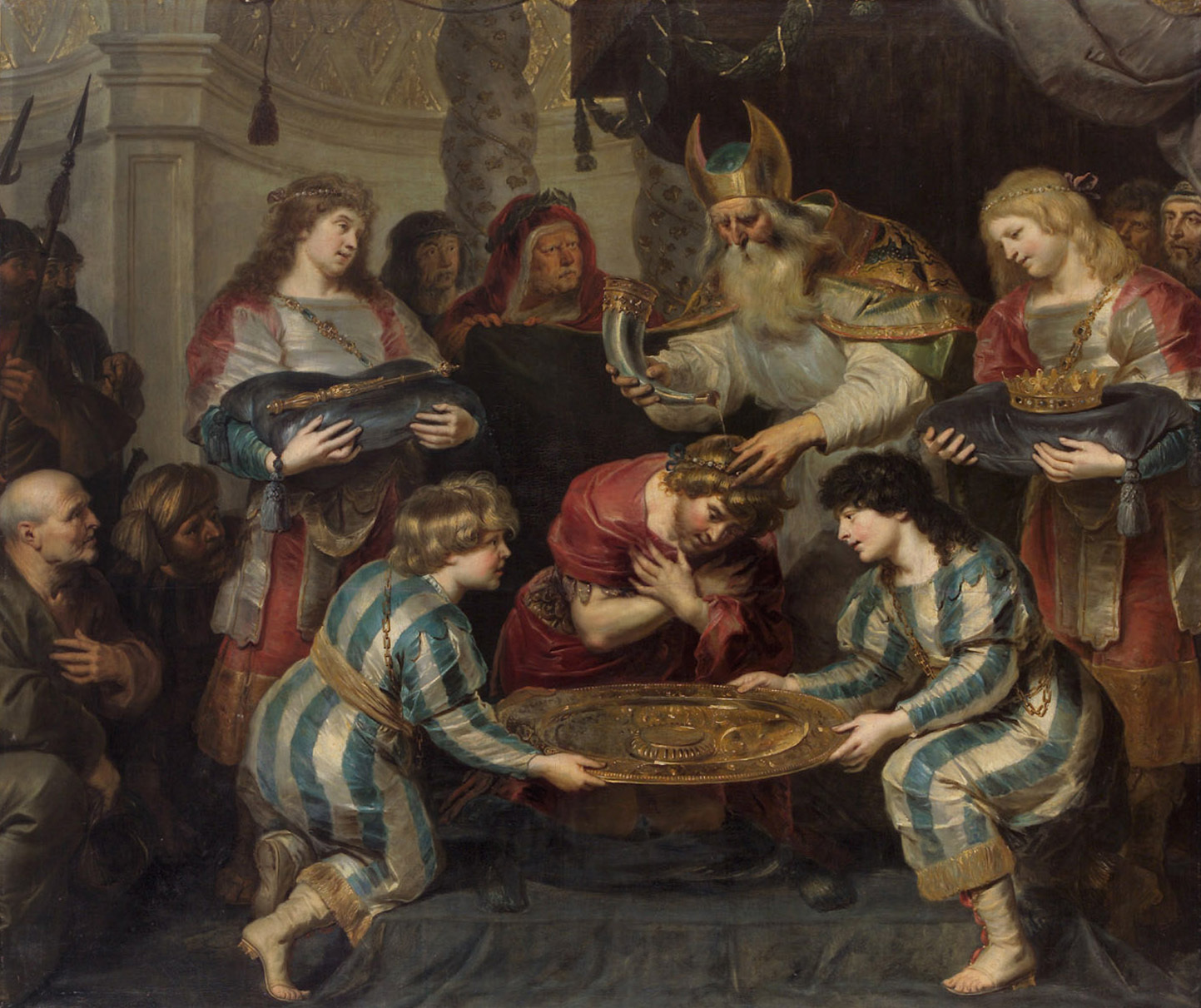
The anointing of Solomon

During this period of busy activity as a painter de Vos continued to operate an art dealership. He also created works specifically for export, primarily to Spain.

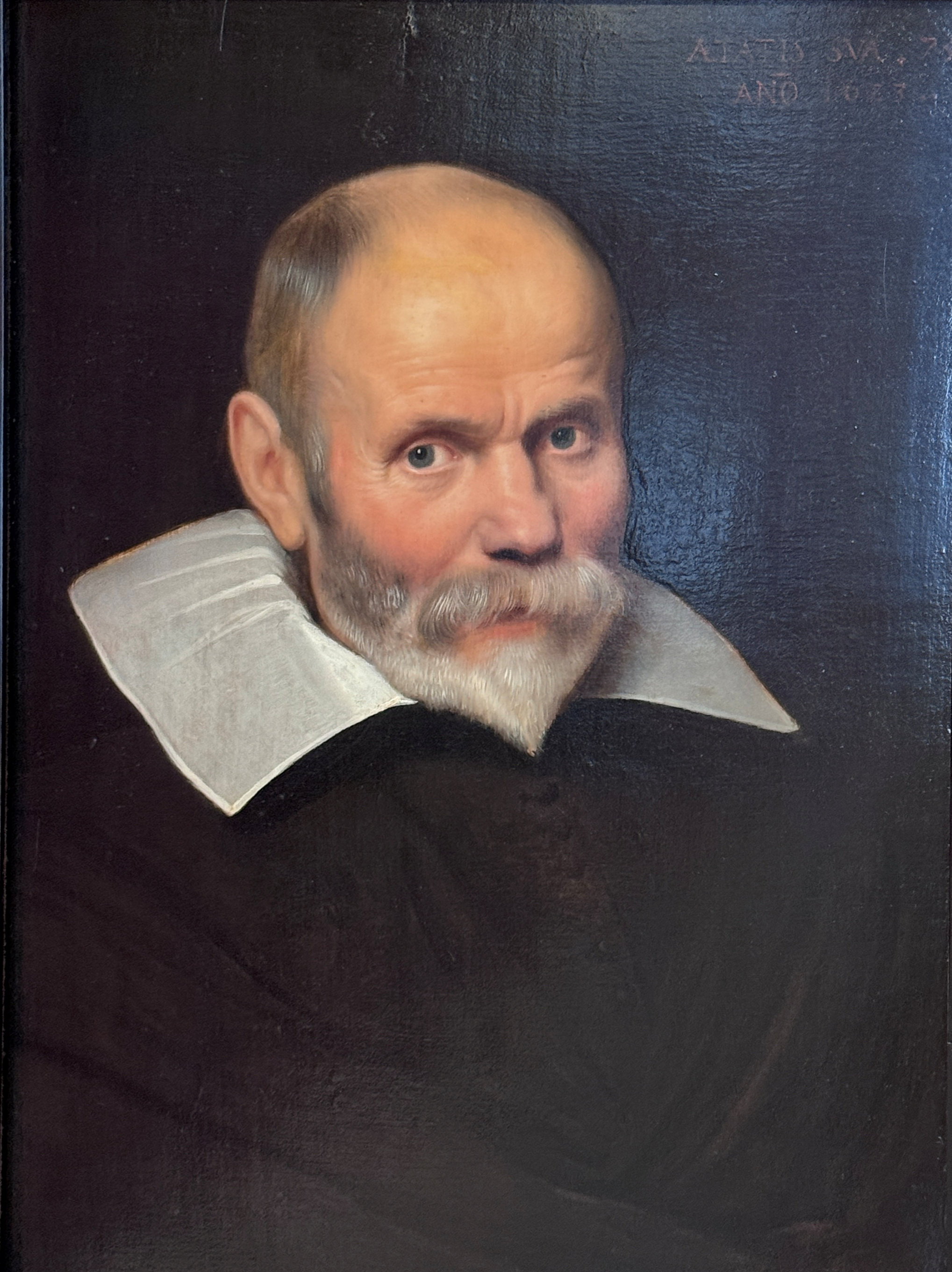
Portrait of a 75-year-old man, Anhaltische Gemäldegalerie Dessau, 1623

Cornelis de Vos was one of the artists working on the decorations for the Joyous Entry into Antwerp of the new governor of the Habsburg Netherlands Cardinal-Infante Ferdinand in 1635. Rubens was in overall charge of this project. De Vos made decorative paintings after designs by Rubens. One of the hewn-out images that crowned the triumphal arch on the Meir, above the Huidevettersstraat, has been preserved and is attributed to the studio of de Vos (Jupiter and Juno, Royal Museum of Fine Arts Antwerp).

In the period 1636-1638 Rubens' workshop received a large commission to make mythological decorations for the hunting pavilion Torre de la Parada of the Spanish king Philip IV near Madrid. For this project de Vos, together with a number of painters from Rubens' circle, painted decorations after oil sketches by Rubens.

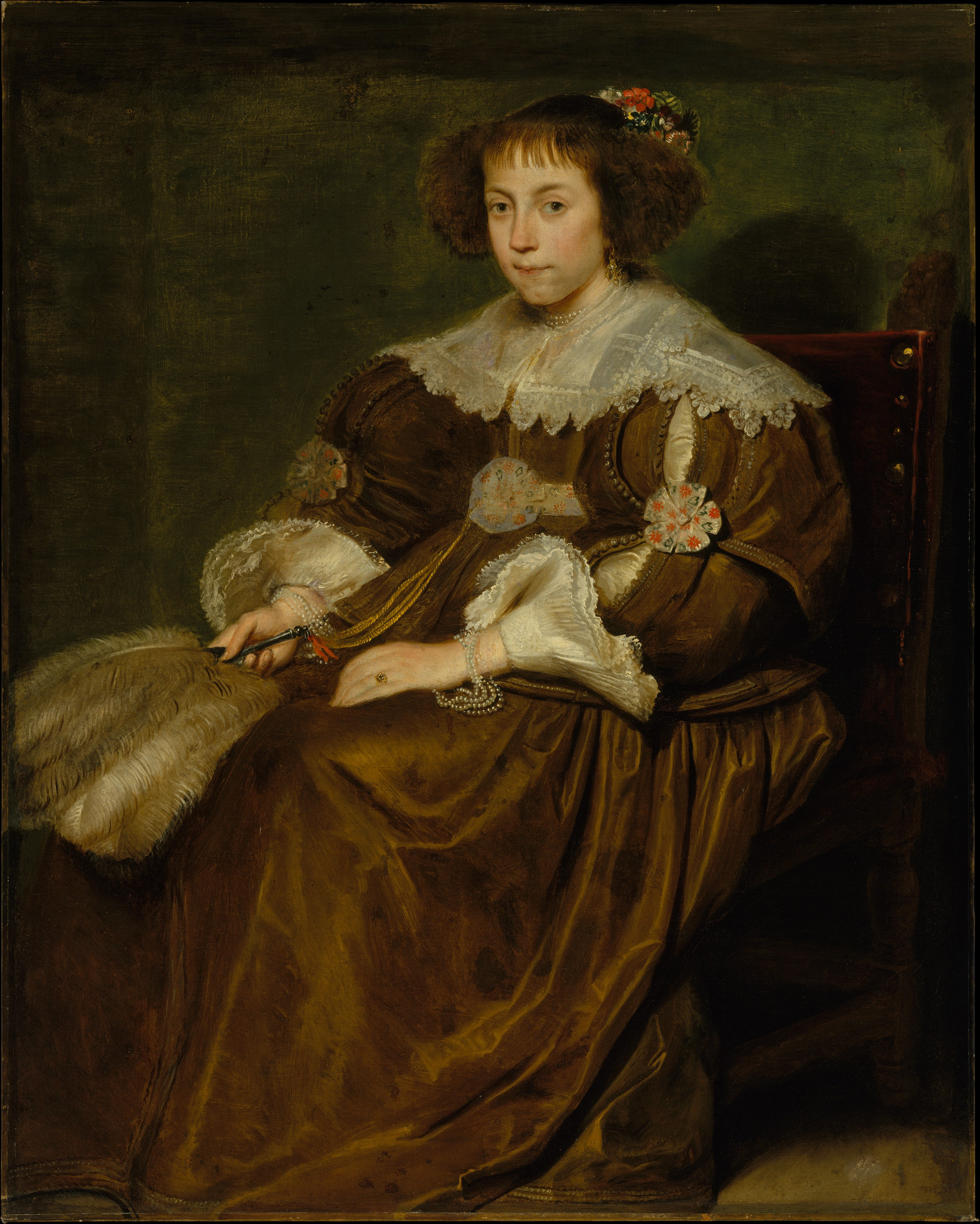
Portrait of a young woman

De Vos died in Antwerp, where he was buried in the Cathedral of Our Lady.

His pupils included Jan Cossiers, Alexander Daemps and Simon de Vos (to whom he was not related).

== Work ==
=== General ===
Cornelis de Vos painted in various genres. He initially painted mainly portraits and mythological, biblical and history scenes. He also created in the late 1620s, some monumental genre paintings. He used the monogram CDVF.

His early work shows a clear influence by Rubens in terms of subject matter, motifs and Carravagesque influences. His work is notable for a warm palette and refined rendering of fabrics and gleaming jewelry with an eye for detail. Important features of his personal style were the lucid plasticity of painted flesh and the bright tactility of highlights. He used a fluid and transparent technique and applied fine brushstrokes.

While in his later work from the thirties he painted with a looser, more painterly technique and was less precise in rendering the details as shown in the Portrait of a young woman (mid 1630s, Metropolitan Museum of Art), his overall technique remained soft and gentle.

=== Portraits ===
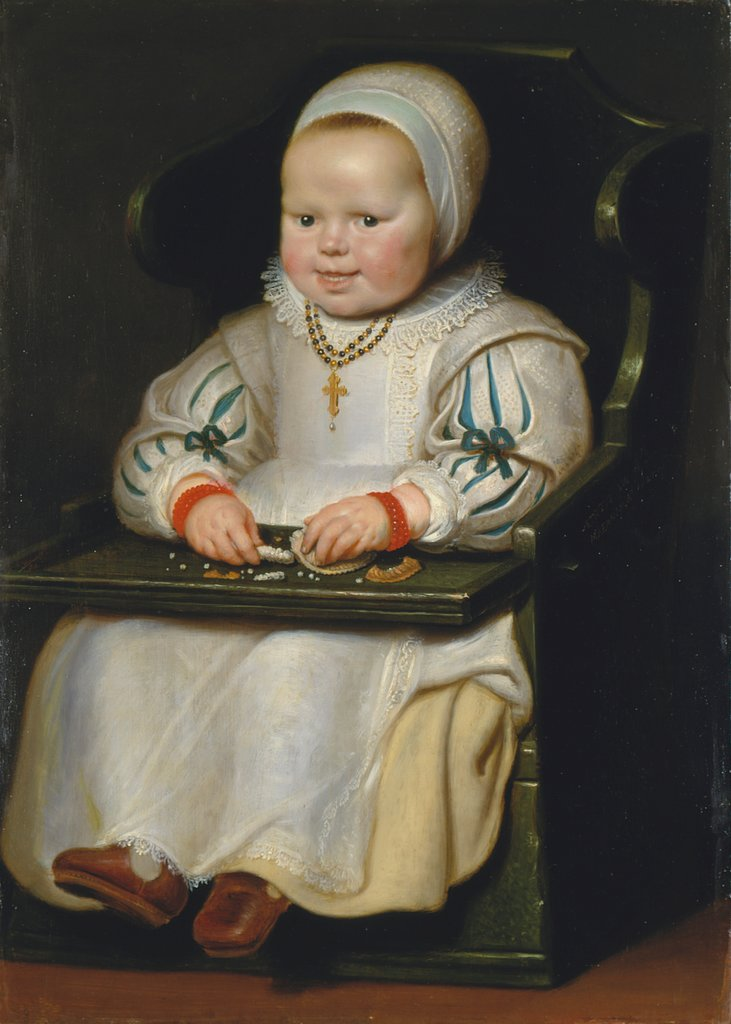
Portrait of Susanna de Vos

De Vos was most successful as a painter of individual and group portraits, a genre in which he developed his own style. After the departure of Anthony van Dyck for England in 1621 and Rubens' absences from Antwerp on diplomatic and artistic missions, de Vos became the leading portraitist of the Antwerp haute-bourgeois and patrician society. His portraits show the influence of van Dyck. He placed his subjects set within restrained but rich interiors. He was able to achieve a sensitive portrayal of the characters of his sitters and the varied textures of their clothes through the use of an even, bright light as well as soft chiaroscuro effects. He only commenced painting full-length portraits after van Dyck's return to Antwerp in 1627. In these portraits the figure is typically placed in front of architecture and an open landscape.

He was particularly skilled in painting group portraits as well as portraits of children. While de Vos' portraits exhibit a new fluency of painting style and spontaneity in the depiction of children, this was combined with a simplicity free from rhetoric that harked back to the earlier Flemish masters. De Vos' portraits are able to communicate a relaxed and warm human affection. In his depiction of children he was a master at expressing their assertive personalities and playful energy. This earned him the recognition of patrons commissioned numerous portraits of children or family portraits featuring children.

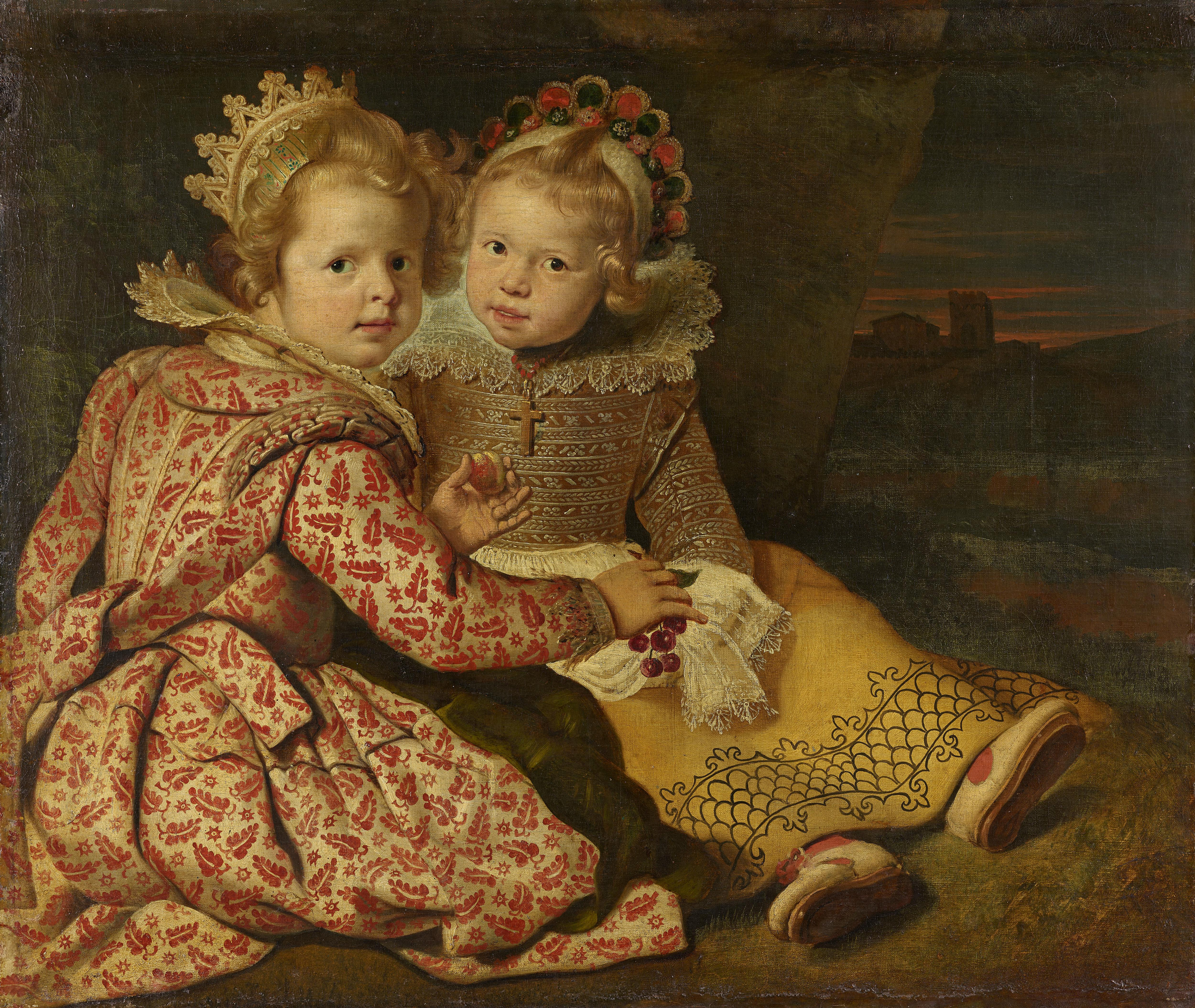
Magdalena and Jan-Baptist de Vos

He produced some striking and intimate portraits of his own children. In a Portrait of his daughter Susanna (1617, Städel) he painted his daughter Susanna in a very informal manner. At first sight the picture seems to be a genre painting rather than a portrait of a particular child. It is clear that the painting was intended for personal use in that he depicted his daughter in a very intimate setting munching sweets. In the portrait of his two eldest children Magdalena and Jan-Baptist, de Vos portrays them not from a distance but brought forward close to the viewer's space. Magdalena looks back at the viewer over her shoulder and seems to invite the viewer in while Jan-Baptist leans forward with tilted head and is also staring at the viewer. He has his feet stretched out and the soles of his shoes are visible. In many of his portraits, de Vos included fruit as symbolic attributes for his sitters. In the portrait of his two eldest children Magdalena holds cherries in her right hand and a peach in her left hand. Peaches and cherries are symbols of youth as well as fertility.

His family portraits emphasize the notion of family happiness, with marriage and the immediate family as the core values. As de Vos' patrons were mainly from the Antwerp bourgeoisie rather than the aristocracy, he was less pressured to magnify his sitters through rhetorical gestures and courtly graces as is commonly seen in van Dyck's portraits. He represents the relationships among the sitters through sensitive hand gestures often deployed in a complex counterpoint: giving, receiving, touching, reassuring. The achievements of his sitters are displayed through their lavish dress and the expensively decorated interiors while the sitters themselves exude solid, amiable and quiet confidence.

=== History paintings ===
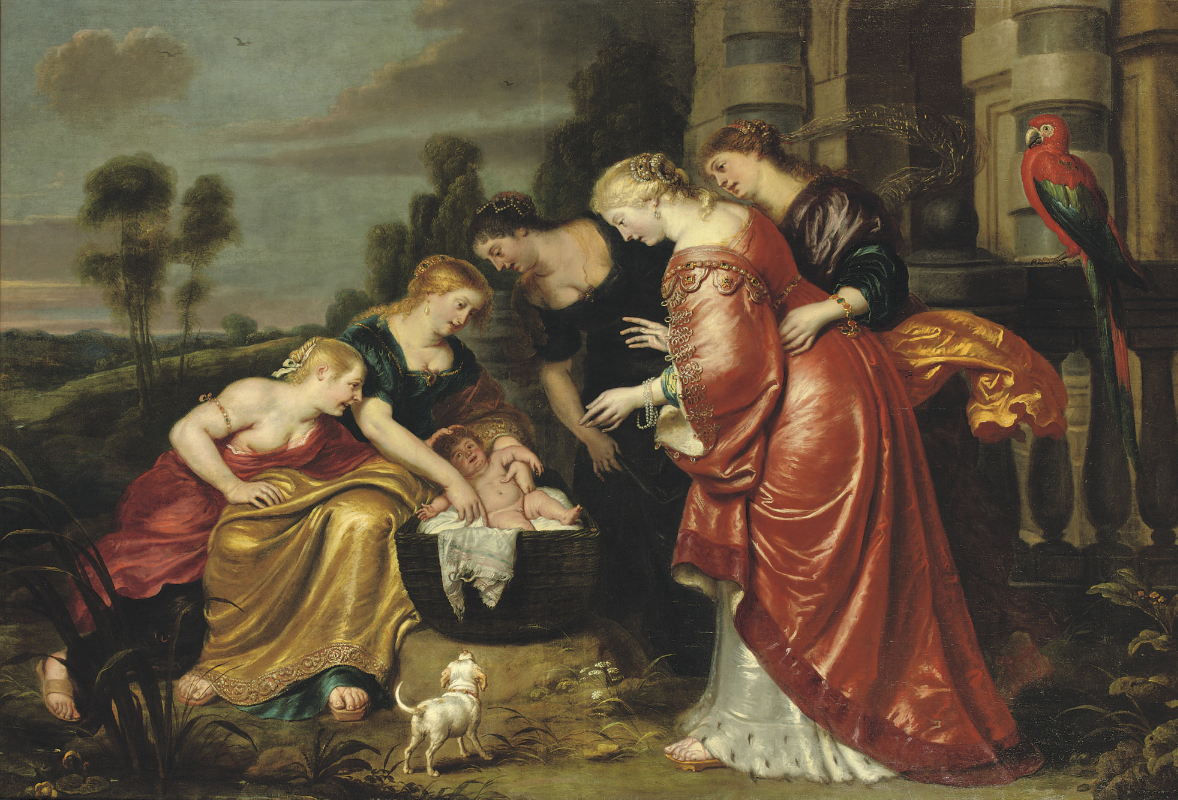
The finding of Moses

While Cornelis de Vos was one of Antwerp's leading portrait painters in the first half of the 17th century, he was also a sought-after painter of history pieces. In particular after circa 1635, de Vos, a successful art dealer, likely realized the growing demand for history paintings in the local and international market. From that date onwards he realized history paintings of a greater diversity in subject matter while his portrait production declined.

De Vos' history paintings relied on compositions of Rubens as their initial inspiration. An example of his can be seen in The Finding of Moses (c. 1631–1635, auctioned by Christie's on 6 May 2008, Amsterdam, lot 82). This painting goes back on a lost painting by Rubens with the same composition and subject matter, which is only known through a copy in a private collection in Geneva.

From 1624 onwards, Cornelis de Vos abandoned his thickly produced brush strokes for a lighter painting style and placed landscapes in the background. This change likely happened under the influence of Rubens. Starting from circa 1630, his compositions became less relief-like and his figures were placed more realistically in the space. The landscape also gradually got more attention while facial expressions became more intensive and the architecture in the background more developed. These changes followed contemporary developments in the Baroque style.

=== Genre paintings ===
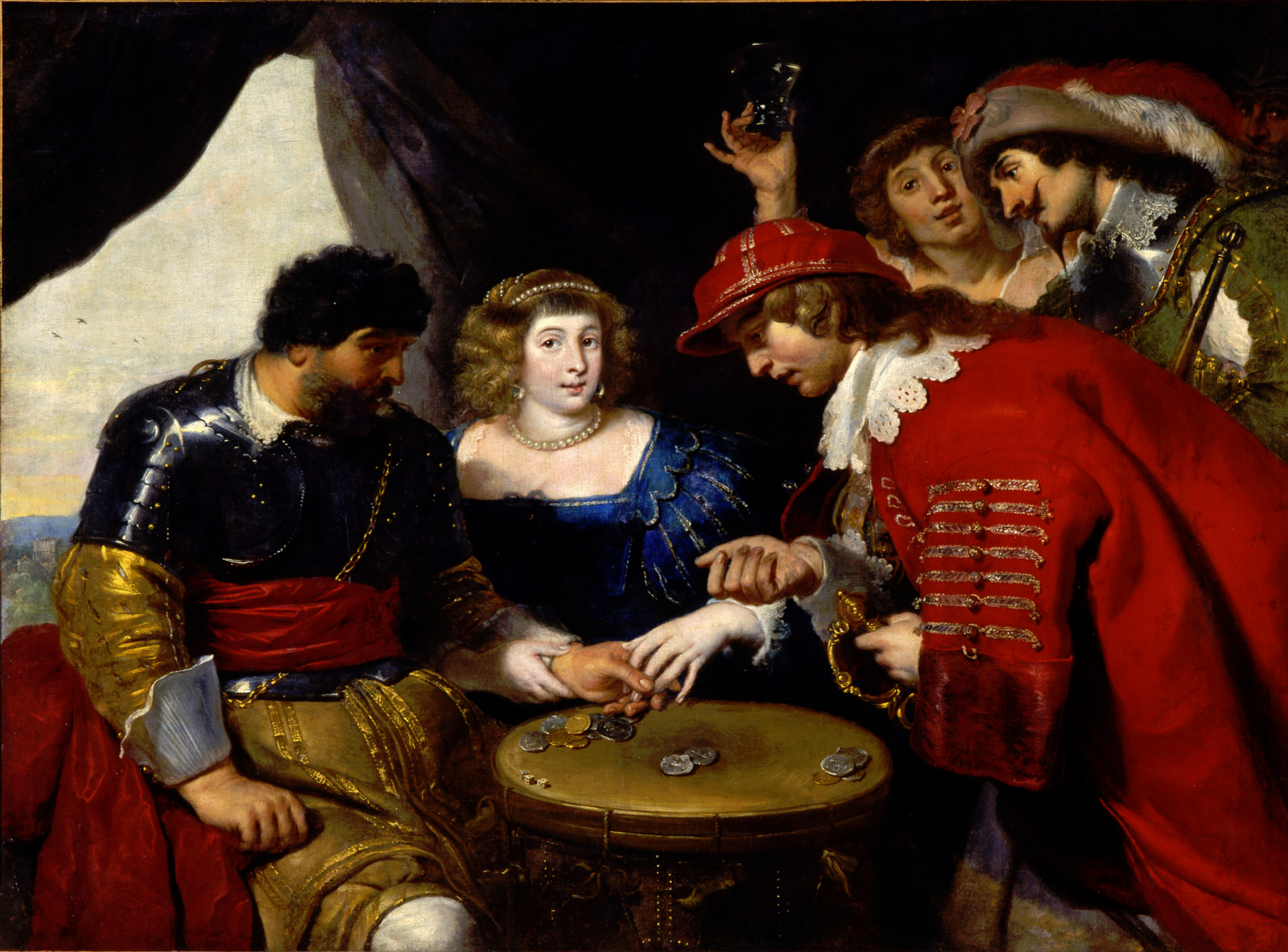
Players and courtesans under a tent

Less well-known are the genre paintings of Cornelis de Vos. These resemble the Caravaggio-influenced compositions of his contemporaries and pupils like Jan Cossiers, Simon de Vos and Theodoor Rombouts. An example is The card game (Nationalmuseum, Stockholm), which depicts players at a card game, a theme which was very popular with the Flemish followers of Caravaggio. The composition is also known through an engraving made by Alexander Voet in the 1630s (Royal Collection), which clearly identifies Cornelis de Vos as the author of the original painting.

Another variation on the theme of players, Players and courtesans under a tent (Musée de Picardie), has been attributed to de Vos based on its similarity with the work in Stockholm. Previously it was attributed to the French follower of Caravaggio, Valentin de Boulogne.

Another genre composition involving backgammon players referred to as The game of backgammon (c. 1630, Musée Boucher-de-Perthes) is attributed to Cornelis de Vos.

=== Collaborations ===
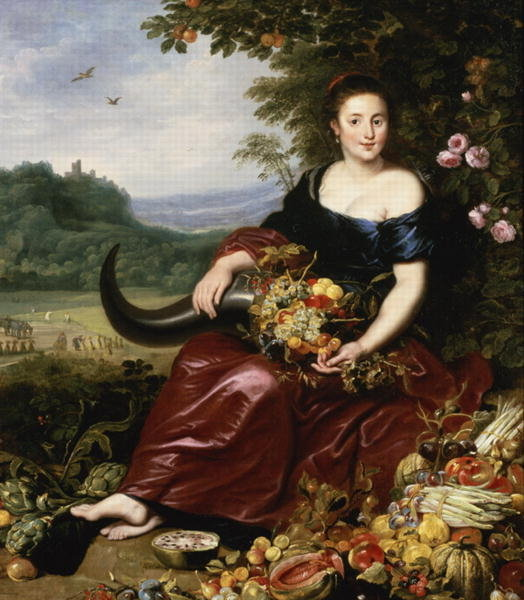
Allegory of Earth, a collaboration with Paul de Vos

Cornelis de Vos often collaborated with fellow artists as was common in Antwerp at the time. He painted the staffage in still lifes by his brother-in-law Frans Snyders and in return his brother Paul and Frans Snyders painted the fruit, animals, silver plate and armour in his own work. Jan Wildens, another brother-in-law, assisted with the landscapes in many of his works.

De Vos was a frequent collaborator of Rubens. Around 1617 he painted two panels, the Adoration of the shepherds and the Presentation in the Temple, that were part of a series of paintings on the theme of the "Mystery of the Rosary Cycle" in which other local painters, including Rubens (who oversaw the project), van Dyck, and Jacob Jordaens participated. De Vos' two paintings joined the 13 paintings made by these other painters in Antwerp's St. Paul's Church. Here they flanked Caravaggio's Madonna of the Rosary, which was placed in the church in 1620. While Caravaggio's masterwork was later stolen by the Austrian masters of the Southern Netherlands, de Vos' works are still in the St. Paul's Church.

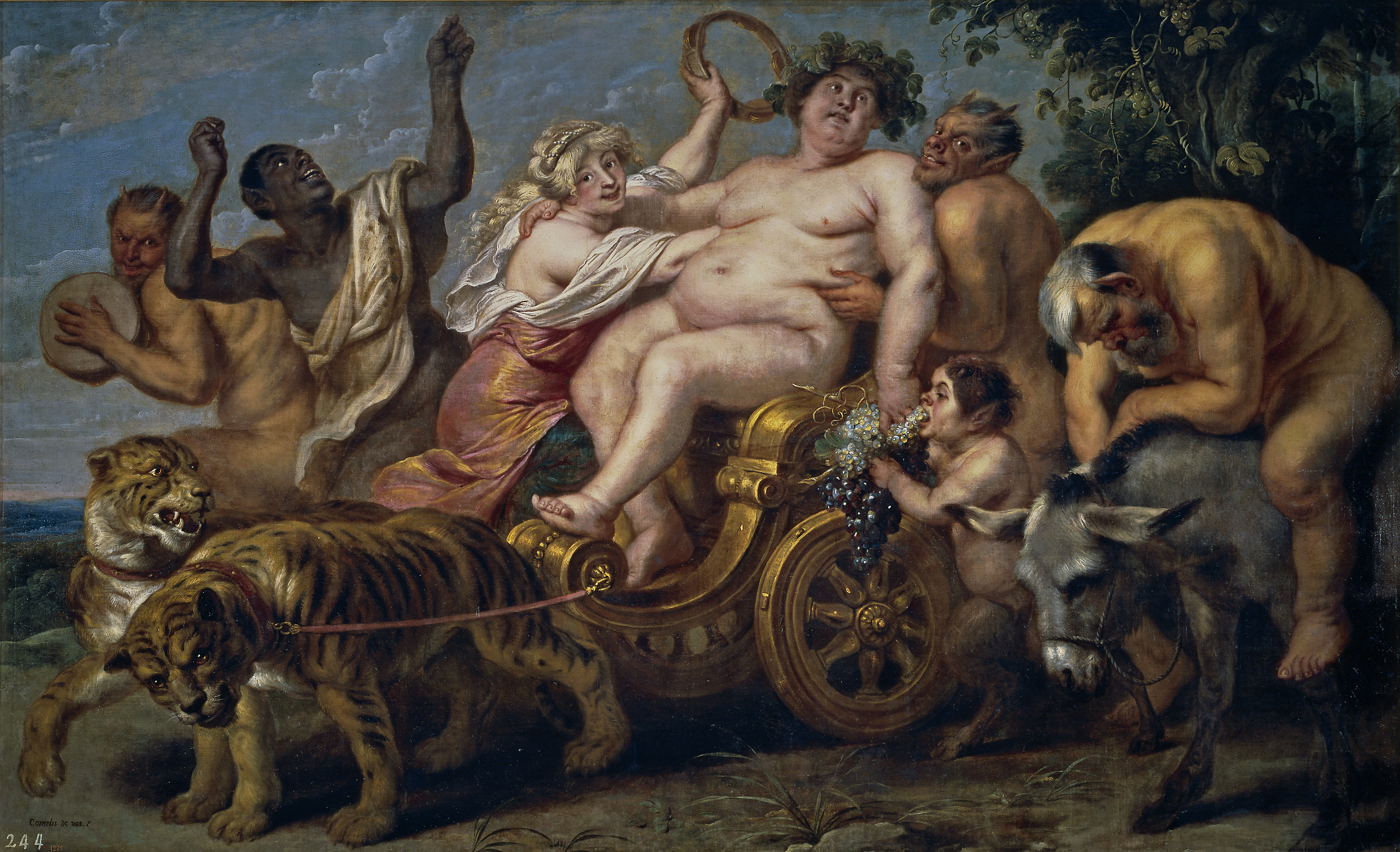
The triumph of Bacchus

De Vos assisted Rubens with the large commissions of the Rubens workshop in the 1630s. He worked for Rubens on the Joyous Entry of the Cardinal-Infante Ferdinand, a project for which he painted twelve royal portraits after Rubens' designs. Between 1636 and 1638 he, along with his brother Paul and many other Antwerp artists, assisted Rubens in decorating the Torre de la Parada, a hunting lodge of Philip IV of Spain near Madrid. Cornelis contributed four paintings on mythological themes to the series made for the Torre de la Parada: The triumph of Bacchus, The birth of Venus, Apollo and the Python and Daphne chased by Apollo. These works are now in the collection of the Prado Museum. They were based on designs by Rubens which have also been preserved. This makes it possible to compare the designs by Rubens with the works completed by Cornelis de Vos. In The triumph of Bacchus de Vos' brush stroke is less energetic and free than that displayed in the Rubens sketch. De Vos' treatment of the faces also differs in that they are less expressive and dramatic than in the sketch.

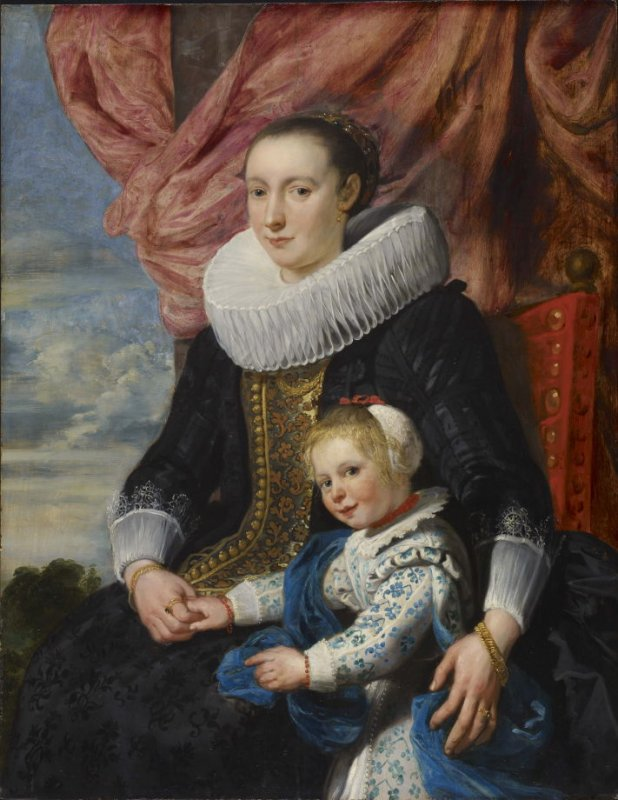
Portrait of a lady with her daughter

While de Vos' collaborations with Rubens on projects in the 1630s appear not to have influenced his style, they did influence his technique.
