= History of clothing and textiles =

Study of fashion and clothing by period in time

The study of the history of clothing and textiles traces the development, use, and availability of clothing and textiles over human history. Clothing and textiles reflect the materials and technologies available in different civilizations at different times. The variety and distribution of clothing and textiles within a society reveal social customs and culture.

The wearing of clothing is exclusively a human characteristic and is a feature of most human societies. Anthropologists believe that animal skins and vegetation were adapted into coverings as protection from cold, heat, and rain, especially as humans migrated to new climates. As early clothing was biodegradable, evidence of when humans started wearing clothes, and what these clothes were made of, has been difficult for scientists to determine. The earliest dates come from studies on the evolution of clothing lice, which suggest humans were wearing clothes sometime between 83,000 and 170,000 years ago. Evidence of silk weaving has been found in China dating to 8,500 years ago. The earliest evidence of cotton being used comes from cotton fibers which had mineralized inside copper beads found in the Indus Valley at the Neolithic site of Mehrgarh, dating to c. 6000 BC. Cotton spinning began in India c. 3000 BC.

Textiles can be felt or spun fibers made into yarn and subsequently netted, looped, knit or woven to make fabrics which appeared in the Middle East during the late Stone Age. From ancient times to the present day, methods of textile production have continually evolved, and the choices of textiles available have influenced how people carry their possessions, clothed themselves, and decorated their surroundings.

Sources available for the study of clothing and textiles include material remains discovered via archaeology; representation of textiles and their manufacture in art; and documents concerning the manufacture, acquisition, use, and trade of fabrics, tools, and finished garments. Scholarship of textile history, especially its earlier stages, is part of material culture studies.

== Prehistoric development ==
Hominin timeline
← / Earlier apes; ← / Gorilla split; ← / Chimpanzee split; ← / Earliest bipedal; ← / Earliest sign of Ardipithecus; ← / Earliest sign of Australopithecus; ← / Earliest stone tools; ← / Earliest sign of Homo; ← / Dispersal beyond Africa; ← / Earliest fire / cooking; ← / Earliest rock art; ← / Earliest clothes; ← / Modern humans
(million years ago)

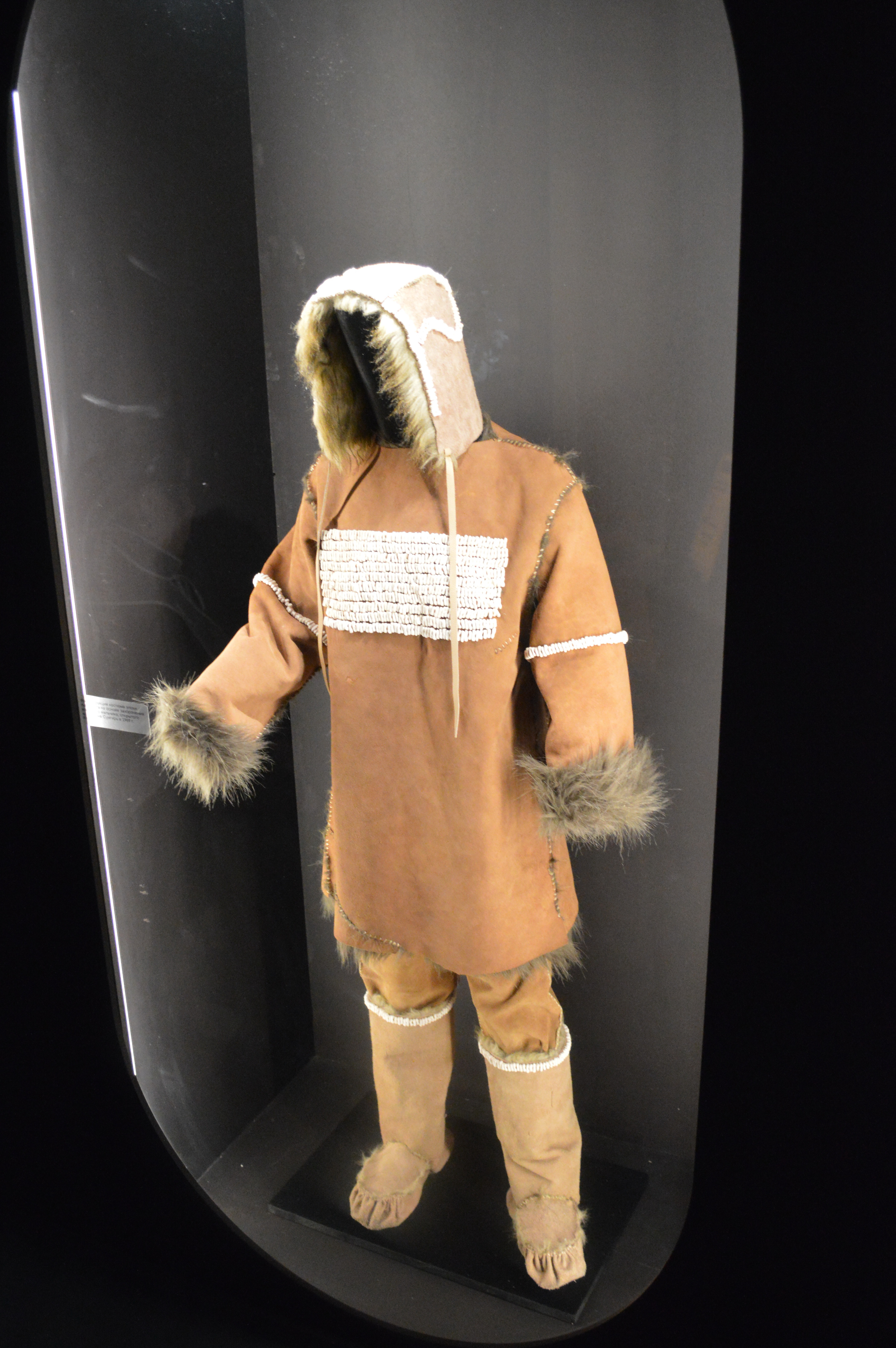
Sungir boy clothes reconstruction, about 30,000 years ago.

The development of textile and clothing in prehistory has been the subject of a number of scholarly studies since the late 20th century. These sources have helped to provide a coherent history of these prehistoric developments. Nonetheless, scientists have never agreed on when humans began wearing clothes and the estimates suggested by various experts have ranged greatly, from 40,000 to as many as 3 million years ago.

Recent studies by Ralf Kittler, Manfred Kayser and Mark Stoneking—anthropologists at the Max Planck Institute for Evolutionary Anthropology—have attempted to constrain the most recent date of the introduction of clothing with an indirect method relying on lice. The rationale for this method of dating stems from the fact that the human body louse (P. humanus corporus) cannot live outside of clothing, dying after only a few hours without shelter. This strongly implies that the date of the body louse's speciation from its parent, the human louse (Pediculus humanus), can have taken place no earlier than the earliest human adoption of clothing. This date, at which the body louse diverged from both its parent species and its sibling subspecies, the head louse (P. humanus capitus), can be determined by the number of mutations each has developed during the intervening time. Such mutations occur at a known rate and the date of last-common-ancestor for two species can therefore be estimated from the difference in number of their respective mutations. These studies have produced dates ranging from 40,000 to 170,000 years ago, with a 2003 study speculating a date of 107,000 years ago, and a 2011 study confirming the most likely time of 170,000 years ago.

Kittler, Kayser and Stoneking suggest that the invention of clothing may have coincided with the northward migration of modern Homo sapiens away from the warm climate of Africa, which is thought to have begun between 100,000 and 50,000 years ago. A second group of researchers, also relying on the genetic clock, estimate that clothing originated between 30,000 and 114,000 years ago. Some of these estimates predate the first known human exodus from Africa. However, other Hominidae species, now extinct, may have also worn clothes and appear to have migrated earlier. It follows that the lice which presently infest human clothing may have first been acquired by Homo sapiens in colder climates from the bodies or discarded clothing of these cousin hominins.

Dating with direct archeological evidence produces dates consistent with those hinted at by lice. In September 2021, scientists reported evidence of clothes being made from 90,000 to 120,000 years ago based on findings in deposits in Morocco. However, despite these archaeological indications and genetic evidence, there is no single estimate that is widely accepted.

Cave paintings and pictorial evidence suggest the existence of dress in the Paleolithic period, around 30,000 years ago, though these were skin drapes. Textile clothing came to notice around 27,000 years ago, while actual textile fragments from 7000 B.C. have been discovered by archeologists.

=== Early adoption of apparel ===
Sewing needles have been dated to at least 50,000 years ago (Denisova Cave, Siberia)—and are likely to have been made by H. Longi, about 10,000 years before the arrival of Neanderthal and human groups in the cave. The oldest possible example is 60,000 years ago, a needlepoint (missing stem and eye) found in Sibudu Cave, South Africa. Other early examples of needles dating from 41,000 to 15,000 years ago are found in multiple locations, e.g. Slovenia, Russia, China, Spain, and France.

The earliest dyed flax fibers have been found in a prehistoric cave in the Republic of Georgia and date back to 36,000.

The 25,000-year-old Venus Figurine "Venus of Lespugue", found in southern France in the Pyrenees, depicts a cloth or twisted fiber skirt. Some other Western Europe figurines were adorned with basket hats or caps, belts were worn at the waist, and a strap of cloth wrapped around the body right above the breast. Eastern European figurines wore belts, hung low on the hips and sometimes string skirts. However, according to archeologists James M. Adovasio, Soffer and Hyland, the garments are more likely ritual wear, real or imagined, which served as a signifier of distinct social categories.

Archaeologists have discovered artifacts from later which appear to have been used in the textile arts: net gauges from 5000 B.C., spindle needles, and weaving sticks.

== Ancient textiles and clothing ==
Knowledge of ancient textiles and clothing has expanded in the recent past due to modern technological developments. One of the earliest fabrics - after the initial use of animal-skin textiles - may have been felt. The earliest known plant-based textile from South America was discovered in Guitarrero Cave in Peru. It was woven out of vegetable fiber and dates back to 8,000 B.C.E. Surviving examples of nålebinding, another textile method emerging after animal-skin textile usage, have been found in Israel; they date from 6500 B.C.

=== Looms ===
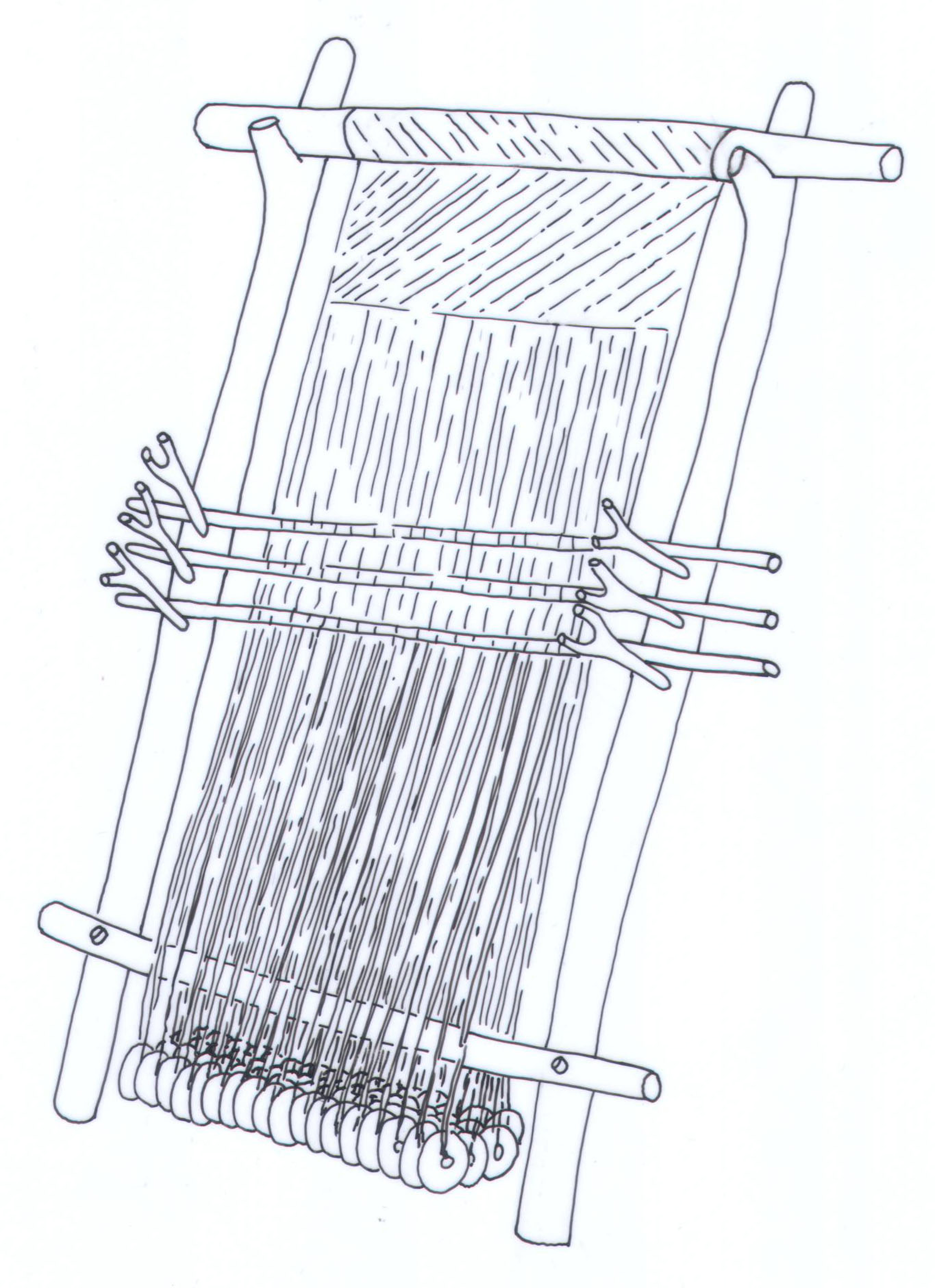
Warp-weighted loom configured for twill weave fabric.

A loom is a device or machine used for weaving cloth. From prehistory through the early Middle Ages, for most of Europe, the Near East and North Africa, two main types of loom dominated textile production: the warp-weighted loom and the two-beam loom. The length of the beam determined the width of the cloth woven upon the loom; it could extend to 2 to 3 meters. Early woven clothing was often made of full loom widths draped, tied, or pinned in place. Large-scale fabrics for clothes were most likely produced on the warp-weighted loom in Central European prehistory: this is evidenced by the numerous finds of loom weights from prehistoric settlements. Even small fragments of large textiles produced on the warp-weighted loom can be identified by their starting border.

=== Preservation ===
Knowledge of ancient cultures varies greatly with the climatic conditions to which archeological deposits are exposed; the Middle East, South America and the arid fringes of China have provided many very early samples in good condition, along with textile impressions in clay, and graphic portrayals. In northern Eurasia, peat bogs, rock-salt mines, oak coffins, and permafrost also preserved textiles, with whole Neolithic garments surviving (some of the most famous are those associated with Ötzi ("the Iceman")), along with artifacts associated with textile production. Early development of textiles in the Indian subcontinent, sub-Saharan Africa and other moist parts of the world remains unclear.

=== Textile trade in the ancient world ===
Throughout the Neolithic and Bronze Ages, the fertile grounds of the Eurasian Steppe provided a setting for a network of nomadic communities to develop and interact. The Steppe Route has long connected regions of the Asian continent with trade and transmission of culture, including clothing.

Around 114 B.C., the Han dynasty, initiated the Silk Road trade-route. Geographically, the Silk Road or Silk Route is an interconnected series of ancient trade routes between Chang'an (present-day Xi'an) in China, Asia Minor and the Mediterranean, extending over 8,000 km (5,000 mi) on land and sea. Trade on the Silk Road was a significant factor in the development of the great civilizations of China, Egypt, Mesopotamia, Persia, the Indian subcontinent, and Rome, and helped to lay the foundations for the modern world. The exchange of luxury textiles was predominant on the Silk Road, which linked traders, merchants, pilgrims, monks, soldiers, nomads and urban dwellers from China to the Mediterranean Sea during various periods.

=== Ancient Near East ===
The earliest known woven textiles of the Near East may be flax fabrics used to wrap the dead; these have been excavated at Çatalhöyük in Anatolia. Found in a Neolithic grave, and "protected by several layers of clay/plaster, in an anaerobic milieu [...] They were 'baked', or 'steam cooked' (une cuisson à l'étouffée)" in a fire. Because of the absence of flax seeds at or near the site, the textile may have been imported from the Levant. Evidence exists of flax cultivation from c. 8000 BC in the Near East, but the breeding of sheep with a wooly fleece rather than hair occurs much later, c. 3000 BC. Well-preserved linen textiles found in the Cave of the Warrior in Judea date from around 3200 BC.

In Mesopotamia, the clothing of a regular Sumerian was very simple, especially in summer. Winter clothes were made of sheep fur. Even wealthy men were depicted with naked torsos, wearing only short skirts, known as kaunakes, while women wore long dresses to their ankles. The king wore a tunic and a coat that reached to his knees, with a belt in the middle. Over time, the development of the craft of wool weaving in Mesopotamia led to a great variety in clothing. Thus, towards the end of the 3rd millennium BC and later men wore tunics with short sleeves and even over the knees, with a belt (over which the rich wore a wool cloak). Women's dresses featured more varied designs: with or without sleeves, narrow or wide, usually long and without highlighting the body

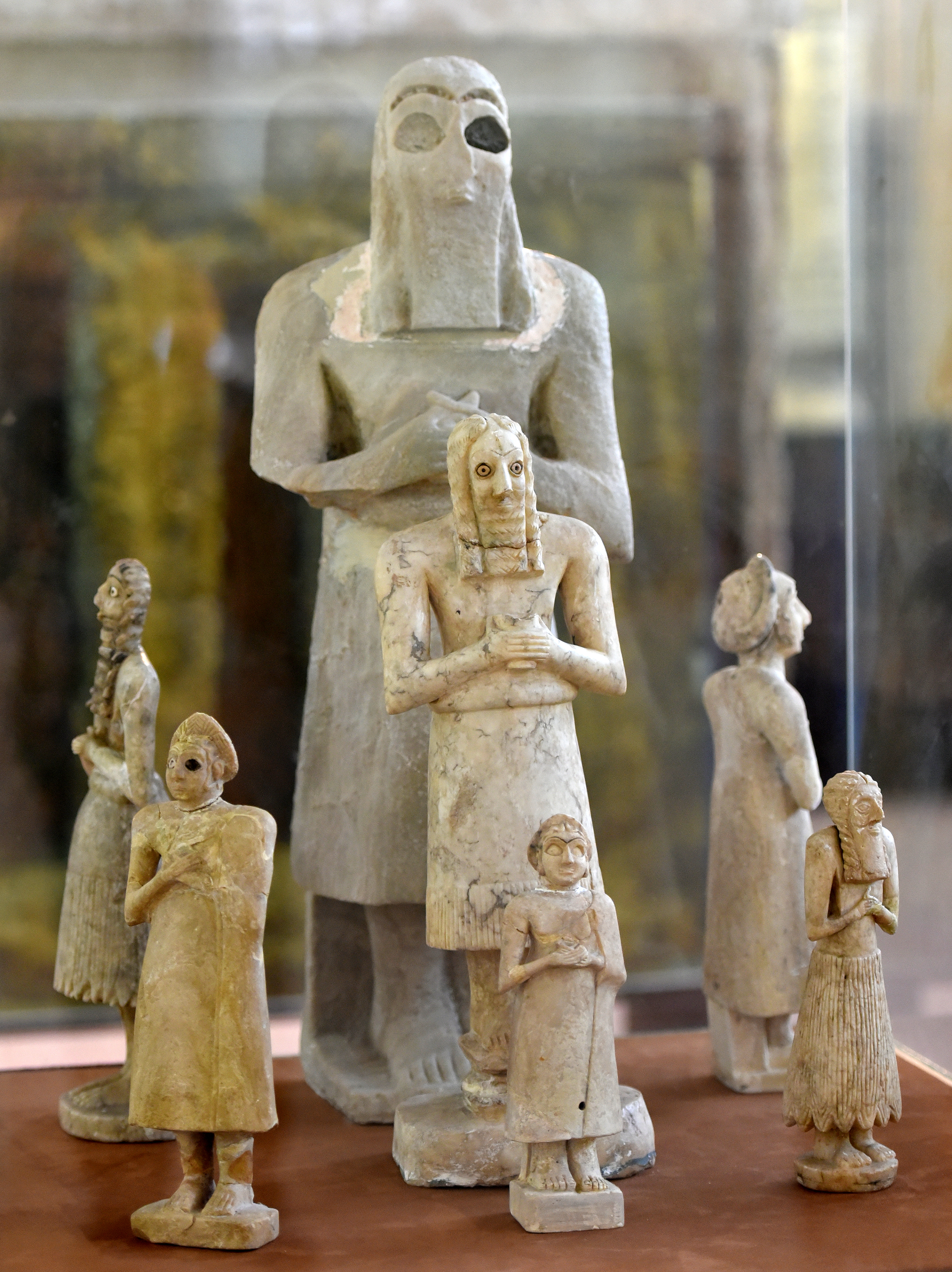
Sumerian Statues of worshippers (males and females); 2800-2400 BC (Early Dynastic period); National Museum of Iraq (Baghdad)

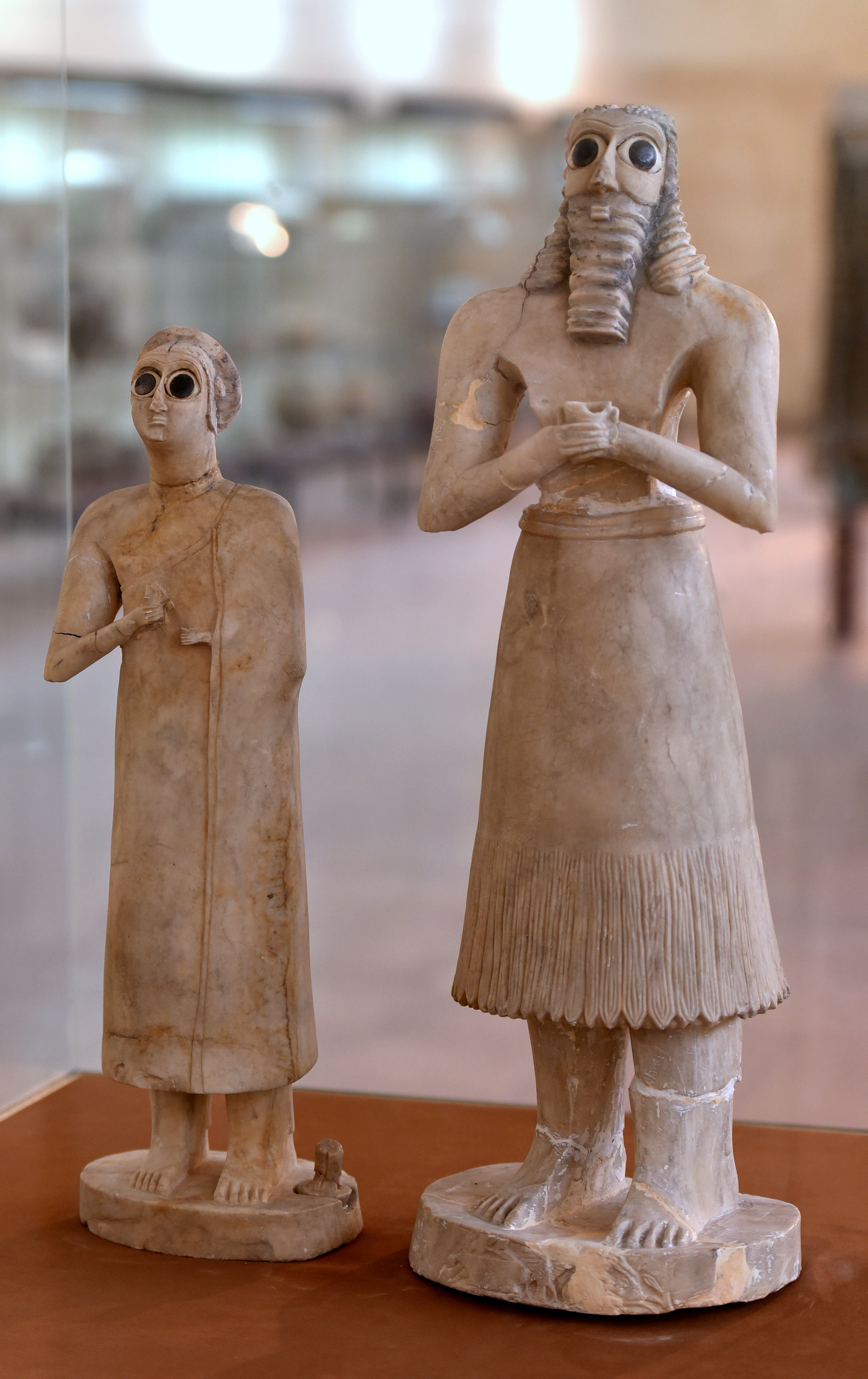
The god Abu (?) and a female statuette; 2800-2400 BC (Early Dynastic period); from the Square Temple of Abu at Tell Asmar (ancient Eshnunna (Iraq)); National Museum of Iraq. The loin-cloth has become recognizably a skirt and the twisted tufts have shrunk to a fringe

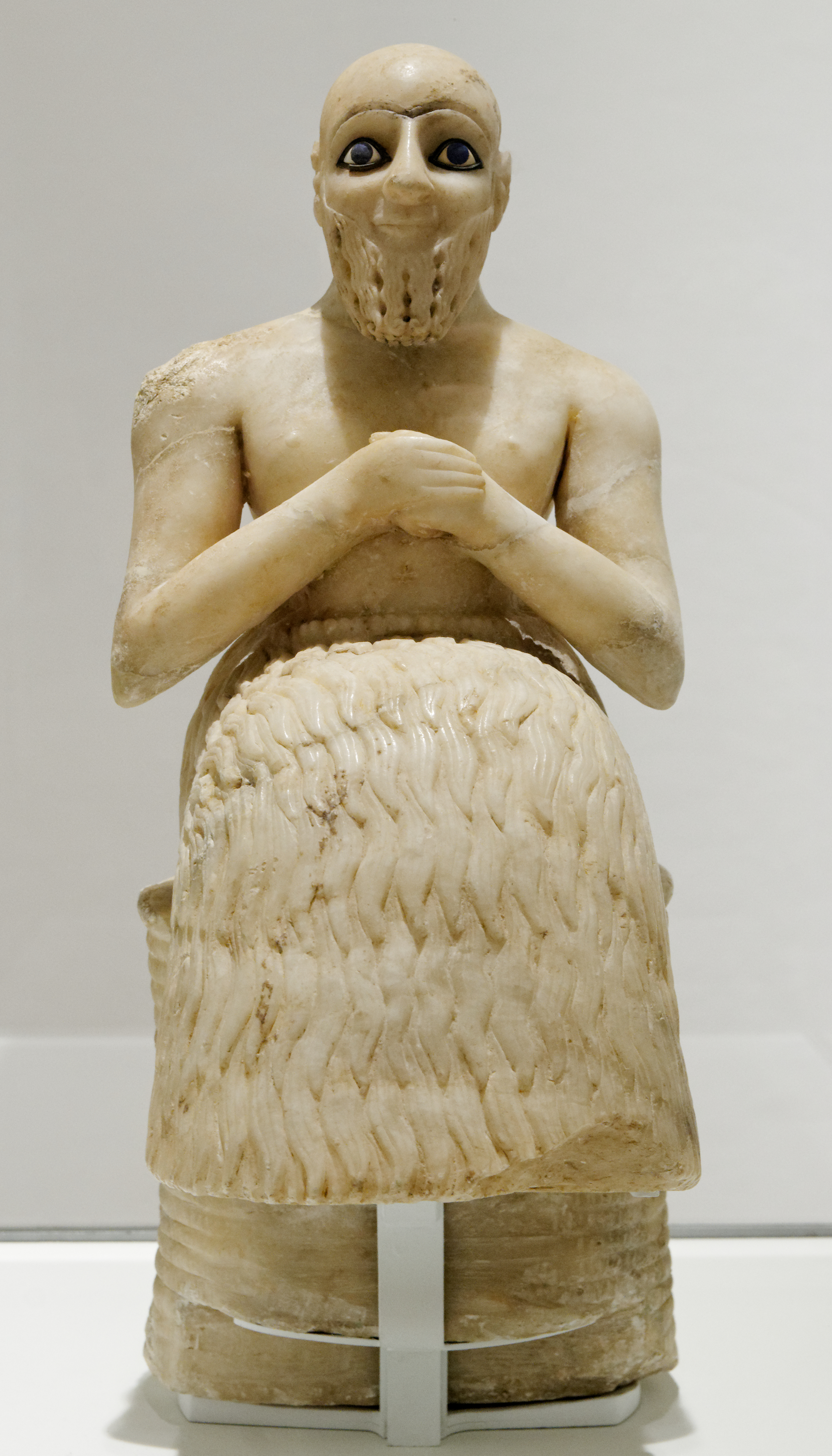
The Statue of Ebih-Il; c. 2400 BCE; gypsum, schist, shells and lapis lazuli; height: 52.5 cm; Louvre (Paris)

=== Ancient India ===
Excavations of sites of the Indus Valley civilization to date have yielded a few twisted cotton threads, in the context of a connecting cord for a bead necklace. However, terracotta figurines uncovered at Mehrgarh show a male figure wearing what is commonly interpreted as a turban. A figurine from the site of Mohenjo-daro, and labeled the "Priest King" depicts the wearing of a shawl with floral patterns. So far, this is the only sculpture from the Indus Valley to show clothing in such explicit detail. Other sculptures of dancing girls, excavated from Mohenjo-daro, only show the wearing of bangles and other jewelry. However, the figurines do not provide any concrete proof to legitimize the history of clothing in the Harappan times.

Harappans may have used natural colors to dye their fabric. Research shows that the cultivation of indigo plants (genus: Indigofera) was prevalent.

Herodotus, an ancient Greek historian, mentions Indian cotton in the 5th century BCE as "a wool exceeding in beauty and goodness that of sheep". When Alexander the Great invaded India in 327 BCE, his troops started wearing cotton clothes that were more comfortable than their previous woolen ones. Strabo, a Greek geographer, mentioned the vividness of Indian fabrics, and Arrian told of Indian–Arab trade of cotton fabrics in 130 CE.

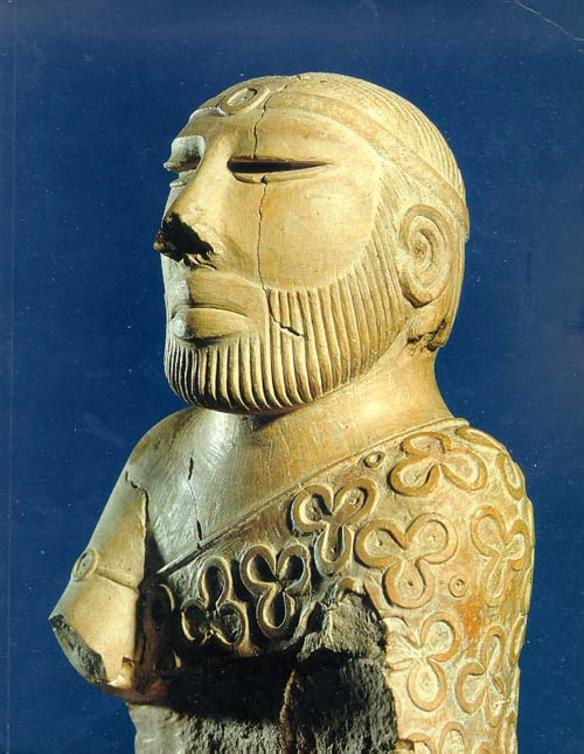
Statue of a figure dubbed the "Priest King" wearing a robe; 2400–1900 BCE; low-fired steatite; National Museum of Pakistan (Karachi)

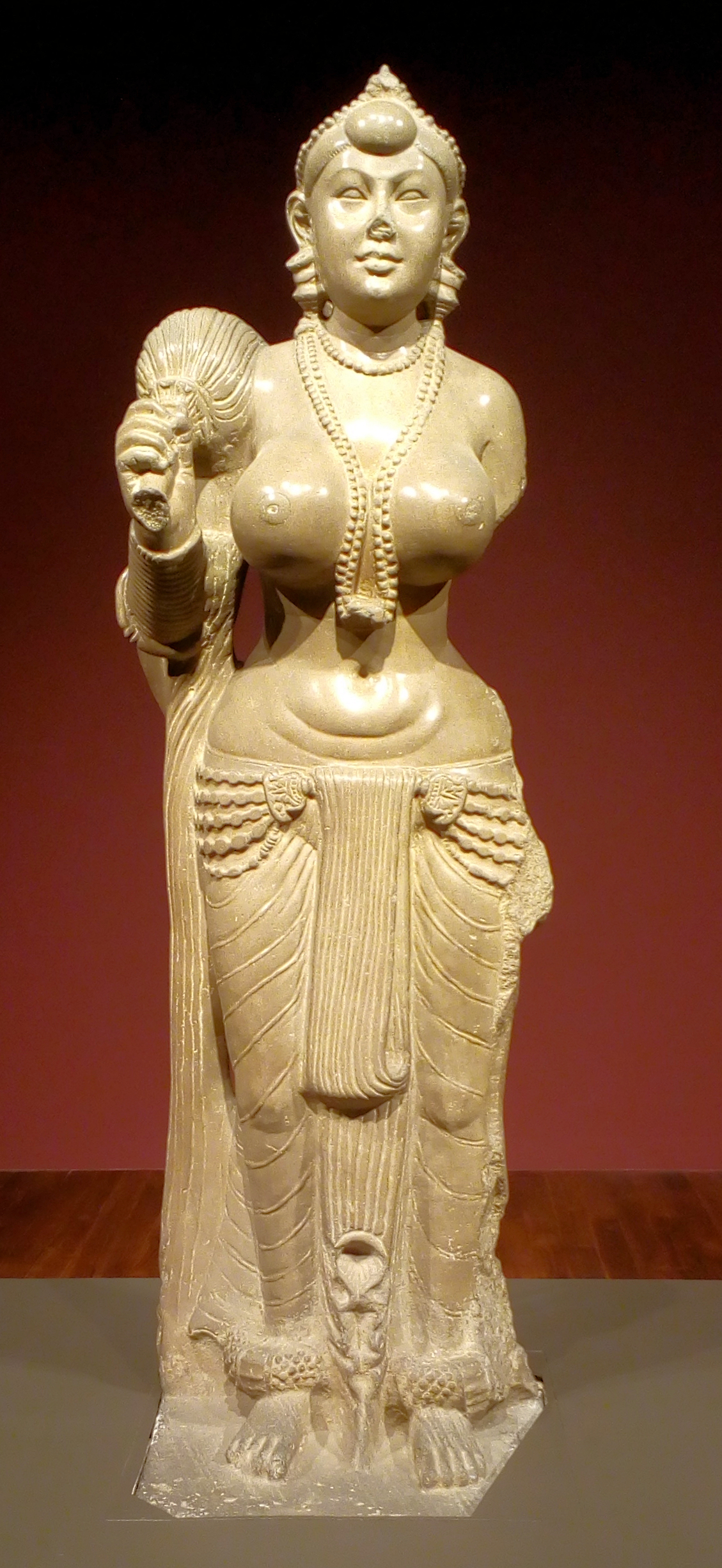
The Didarganj Yakshi depicting the dhoti wrap; c. 300 BC; Bihar Museum (India)

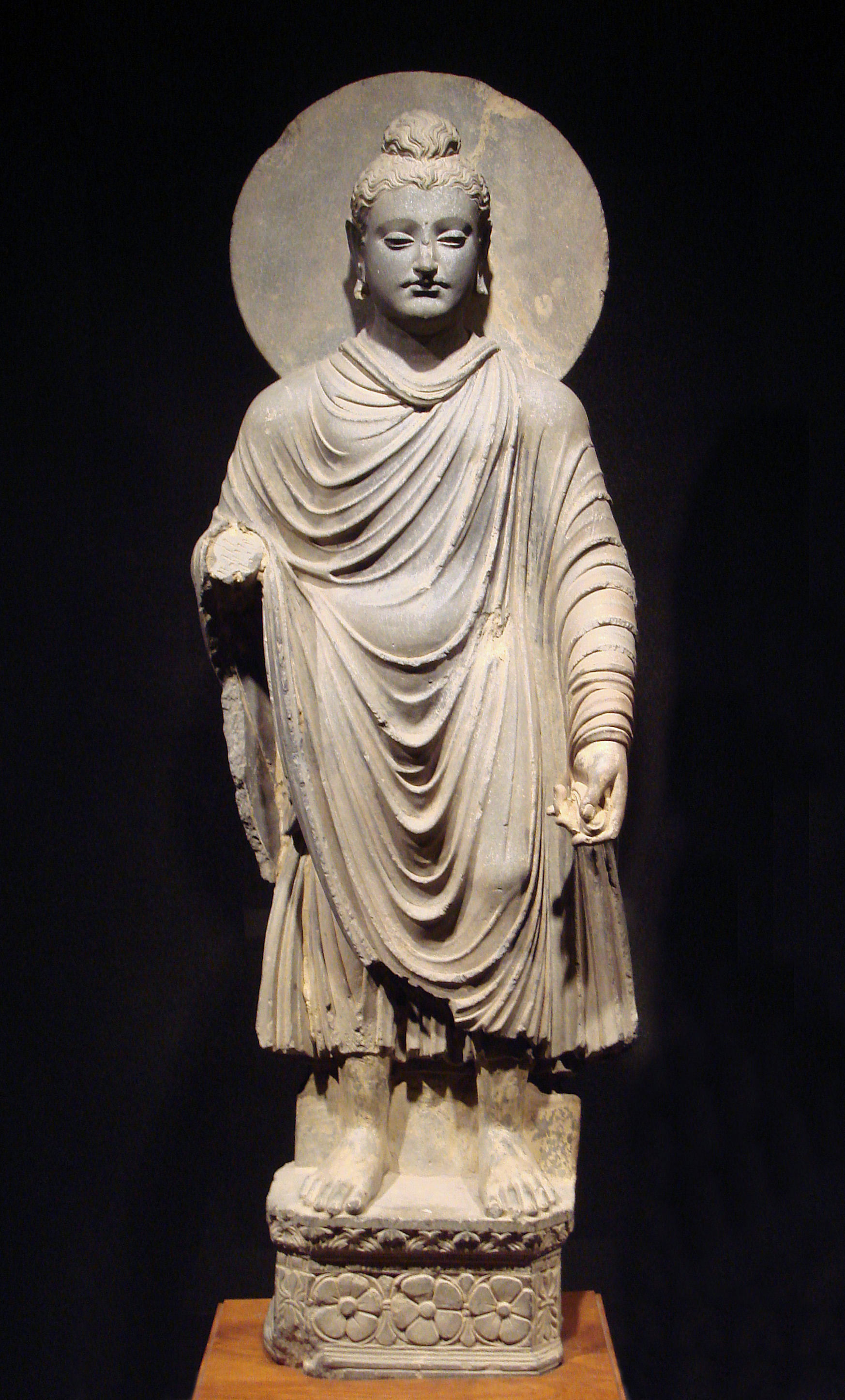
The Buddha wearing kāṣāya robes; c. 200 BC; Tokyo National Museum (Japan)

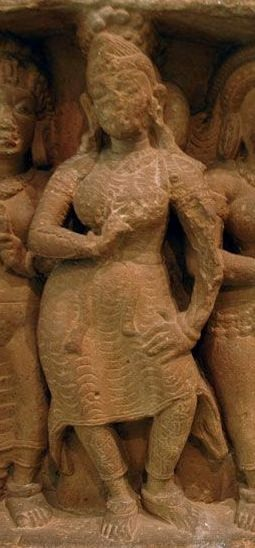
Ancient form of Churidar worn during the Gupta period; c. 300 AD; National Museum (New Delhi)

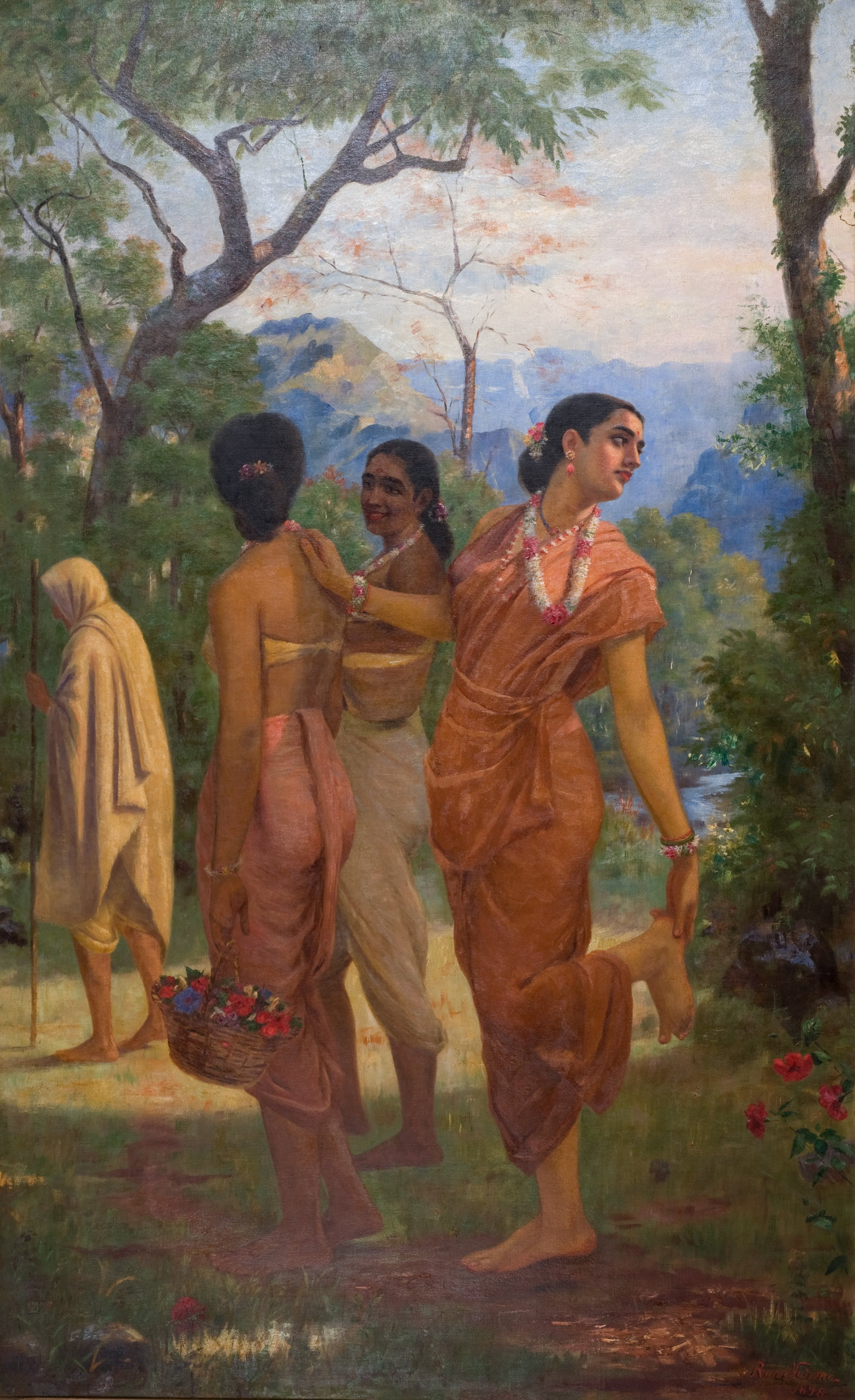
Shakuntala, wife of Dushyanta and the mother of Emperor Bharata, from Kalidasa's play Abhijñānaśākuntala, wearing a sari, painting by Raja Ravi Varma, c. 1870.

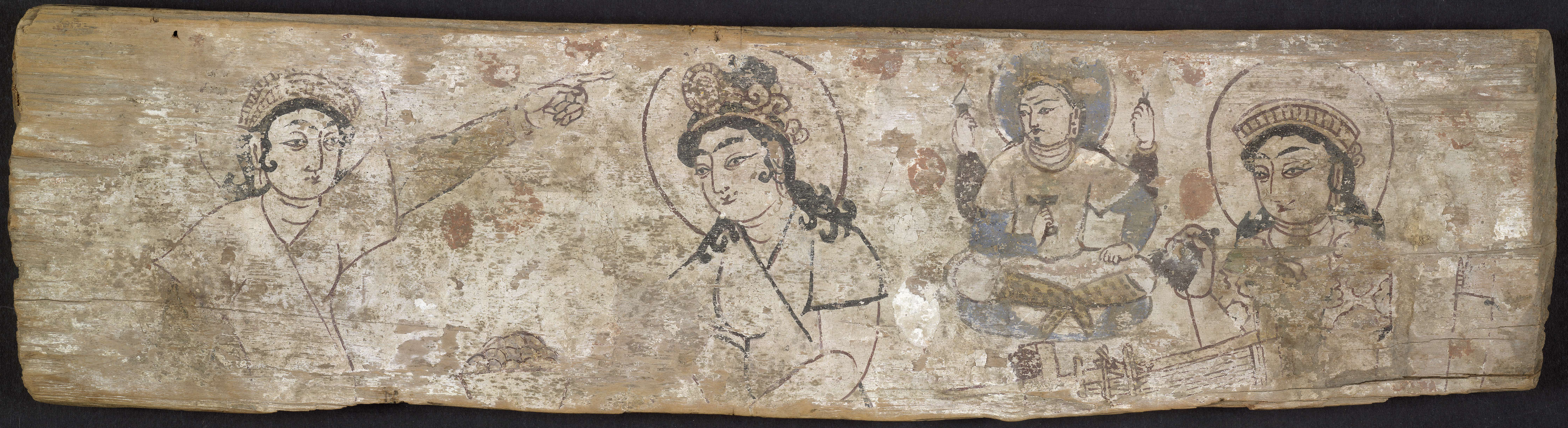
Painting on wooden panel discovered by Aurel Stein in Dandan Oilik, depicting the legend of the princess who hid silk-worm eggs in her headdress to smuggle them out of China to the Kingdom of Khotan in the Tarim Basin; 7th to 8th century; British Museum (London)

=== Ancient Egypt ===
Evidence exists for the production of linen cloth in Ancient Egypt in the Neolithic period, c. 5500 BC. Cultivation of domesticated wild flax, probably an import from the Levant, is documented as early as c. 6000 BC. Other bast fibers including rush, reed, palm, and papyrus were used alone or with linen to make rope and other textiles. Evidence for wool production in Egypt is scanty at this period, although there are examples of wool tunics from Greco-Roman Egypt in late antiquity.

Ancient Egyptian spinning techniques included the drop spindle, hand-to-hand spinning, and rolling on the thigh; yarn was also spliced. A horizontal ground loom was used prior to the New Kingdom (16th to 11th centuries BCE), when a vertical two-beam loom was introduced, probably from Asia.

The Ancient Egyptian burial custom of mummification used linen bandages, and art depicts Egyptian men wearing linen kilts and women in narrow dresses with various forms of shirts and jackets, often of sheer pleated fabric.

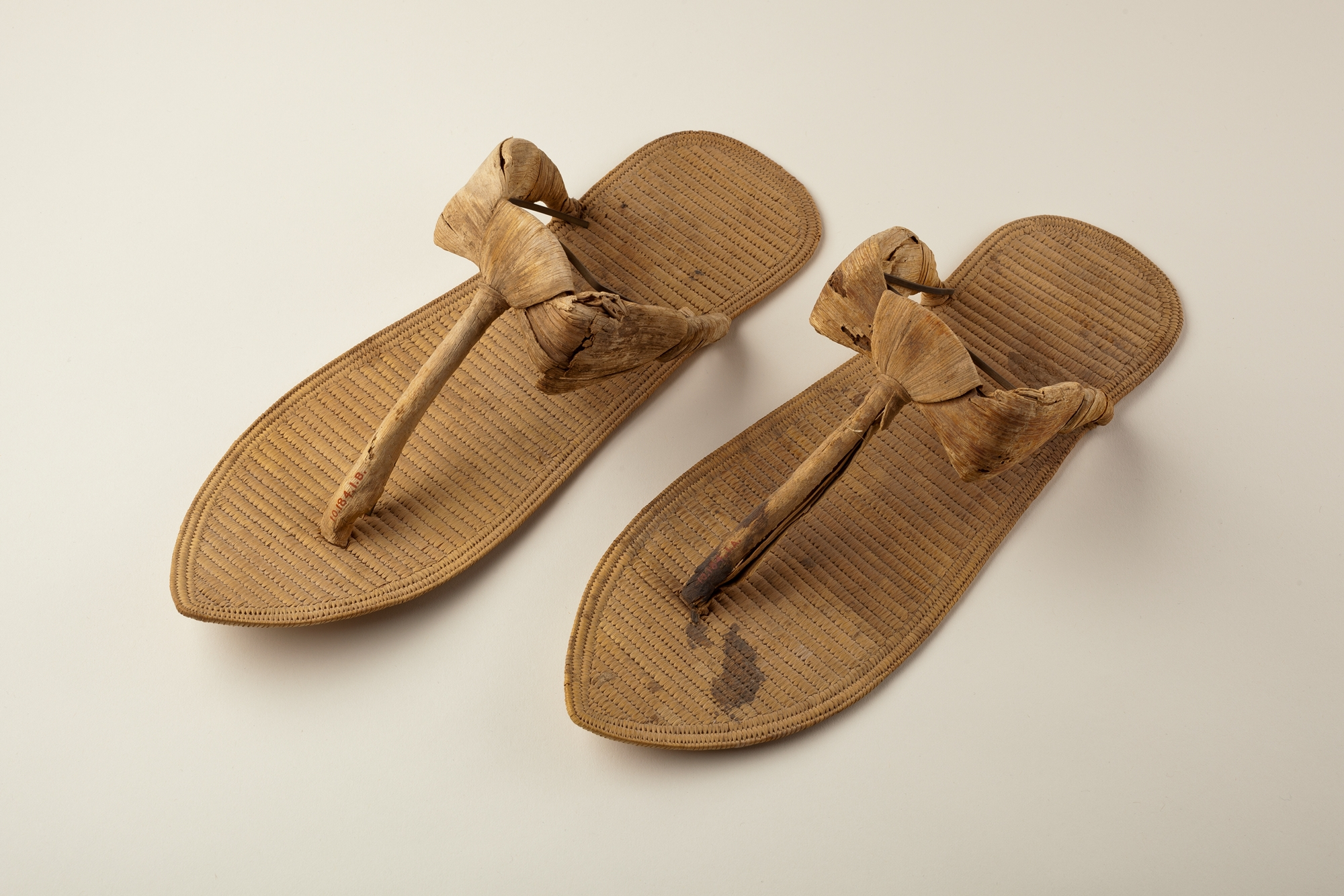
Pair of sandals; 1390–1352 BC; grass, reed and papyrus; Metropolitan Museum of Art (New York City)

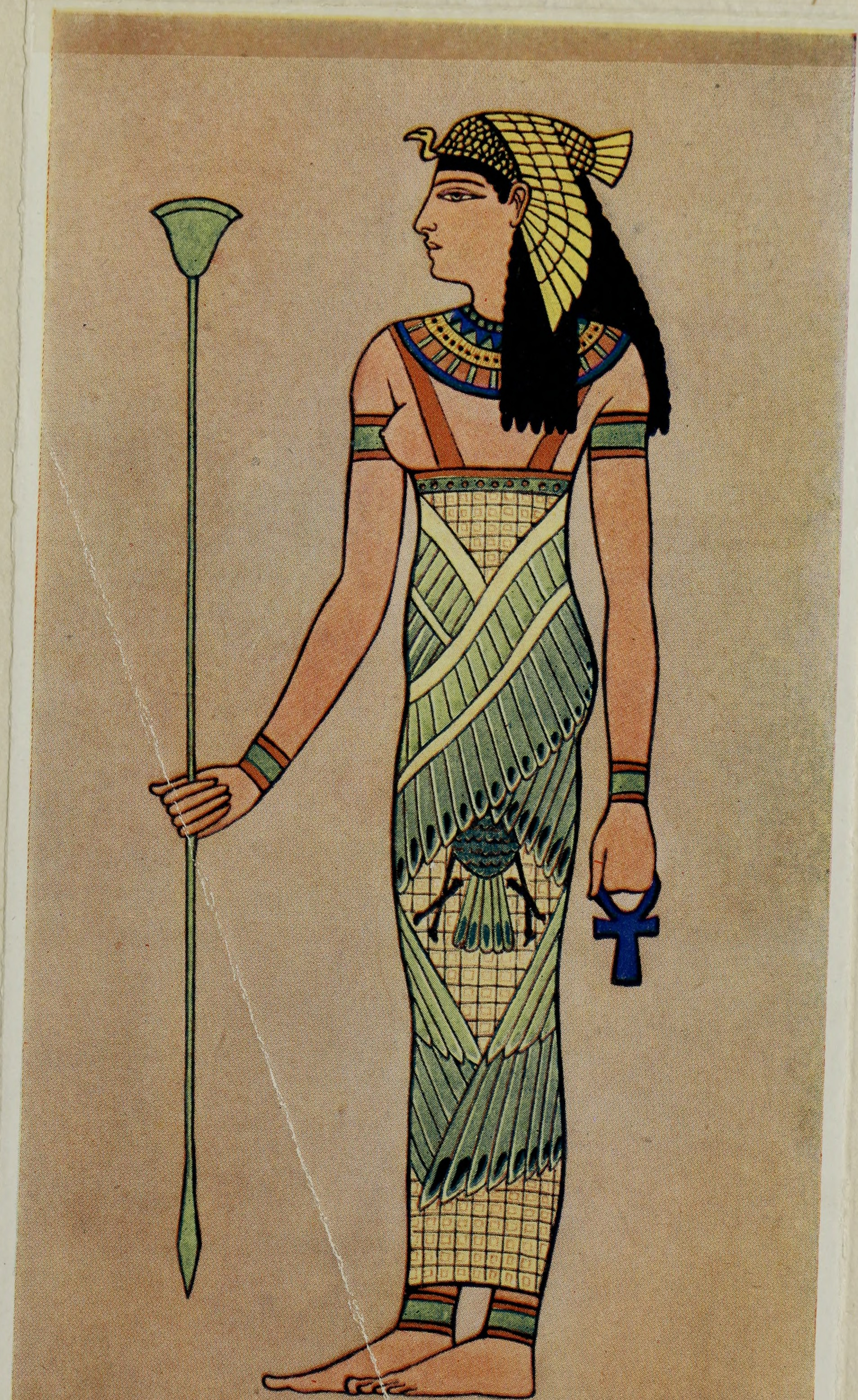
Illustration from the book Ancient Egyptian, Assyrian, and Persian costumes and decorations

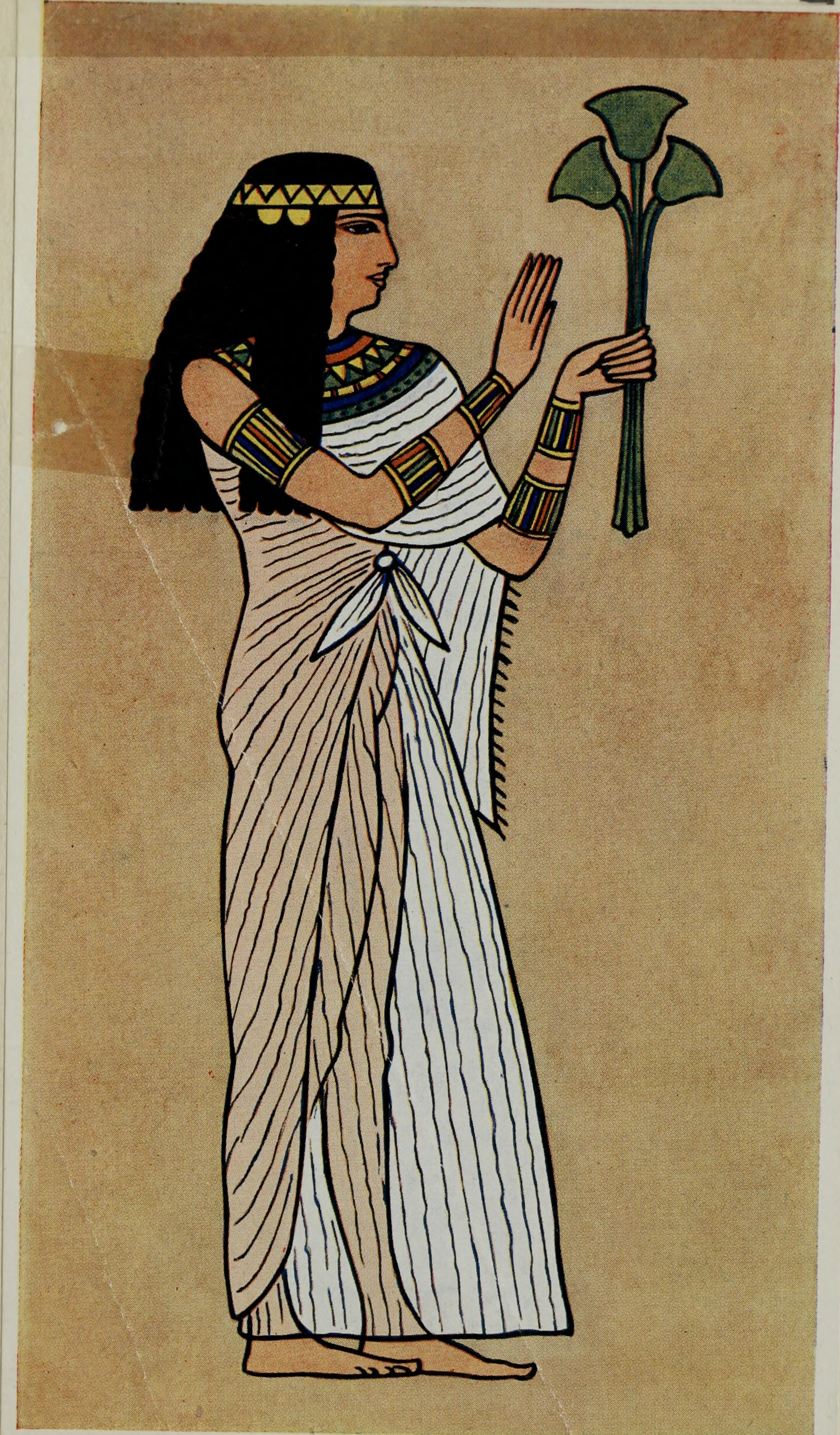
Illustration of a Goddess from Ancient Egyptian, Assyrian, and Persian costumes and decorations

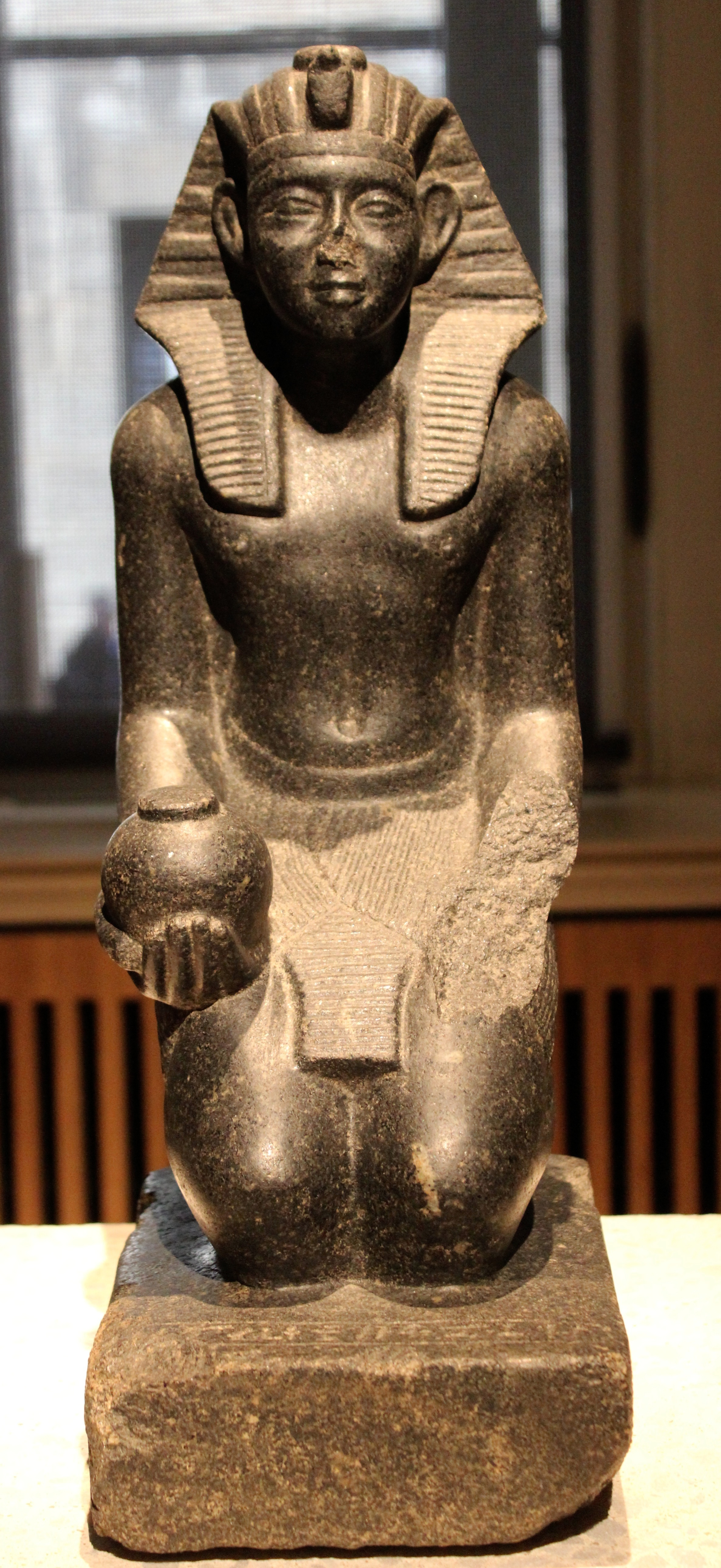
Statue of Sobekhotep VI, who wears the Egyptian male skirt, the shendyt, from Neues Museum (Berlin, Germany)

=== Ancient China ===
The earliest known evidence of silk production in China occurs at the sites of Yangshao culture in Xia, Shanxi, where a cocoon of bombyx mori, the domesticated silkworm, cut in half by a sharp knife, dates from between 5000 and 3000 BC. Fragments of primitive looms are also seen from the sites of Hemudu culture in Yuyao, Zhejiang, dated to about 4000 BC. Scraps of silk have been found in a Liangzhu culture site at Qianshanyang in Huzhou, Zhejiang, dating back to 2700 BC. Other fragments have been recovered from royal tombs of the [Shang Dynasty] (c. 1600 to c. 1046 BC).

Under the Shang Dynasty, Han Chinese clothing or Hanfu consisted of a yi, a narrow-cuffed, knee-length tunic tied with a sash, and a narrow, ankle-length skirt, called shang, worn with a bixi, a length of fabric that reached the knees. Clothing of the élite was made of silk in vivid primary colours.

Painting of Emperor Yao wearing a shenyi

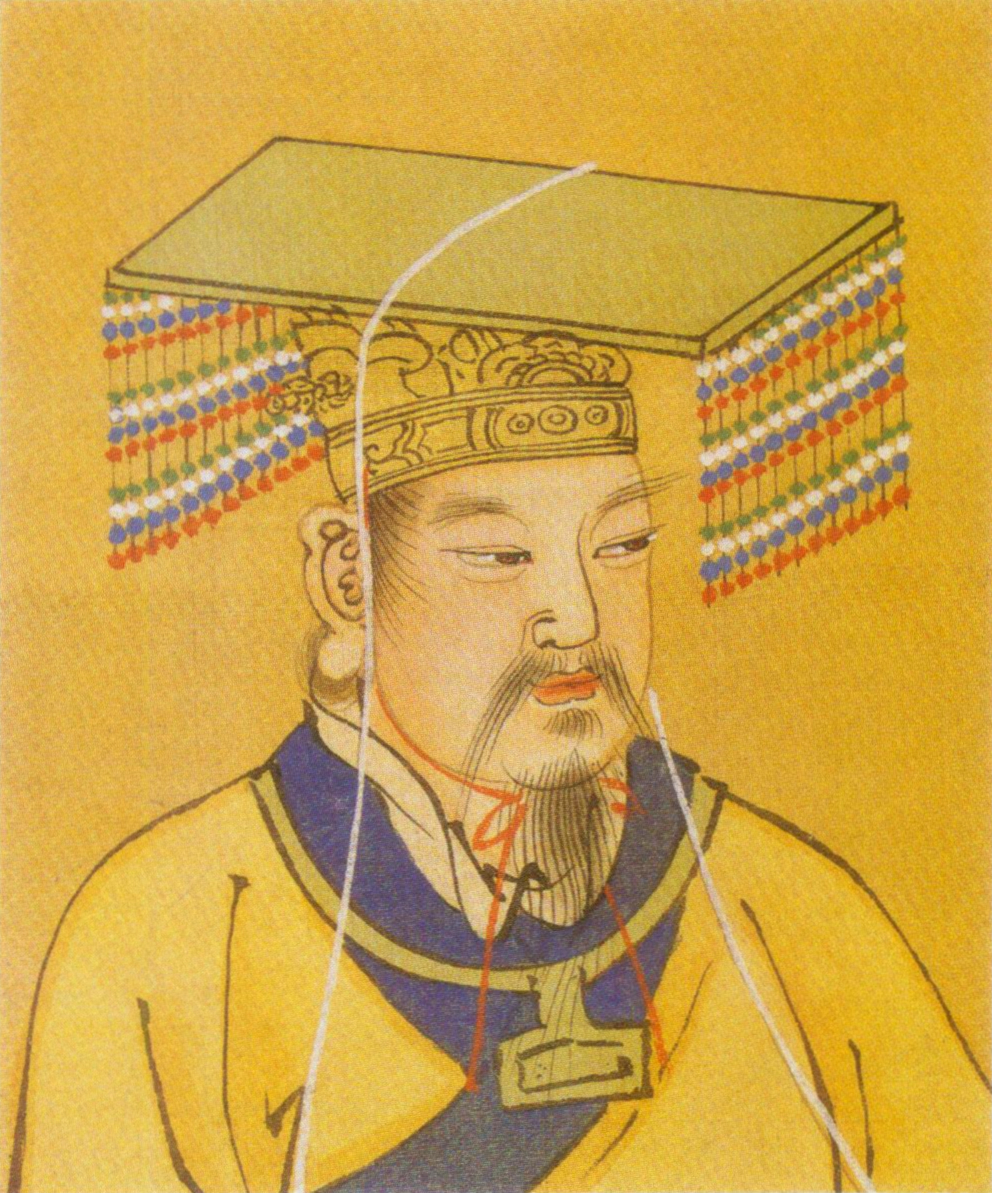
The Yellow Emperor wearing a mianguan

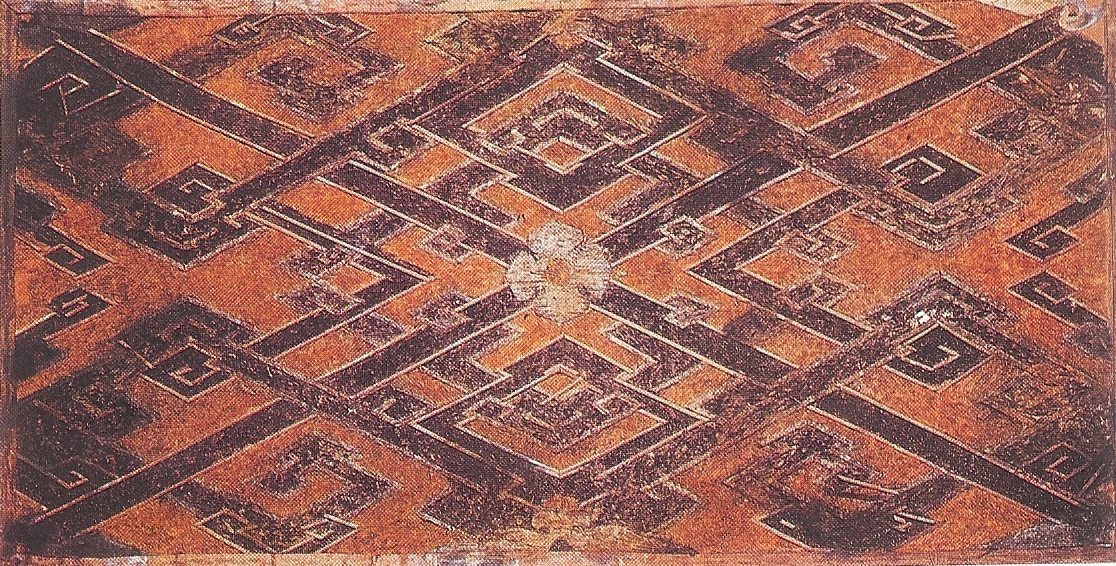
Woven silk textile from the Mawangdui in Changsha (Hunan province, China), from the 2nd century BC

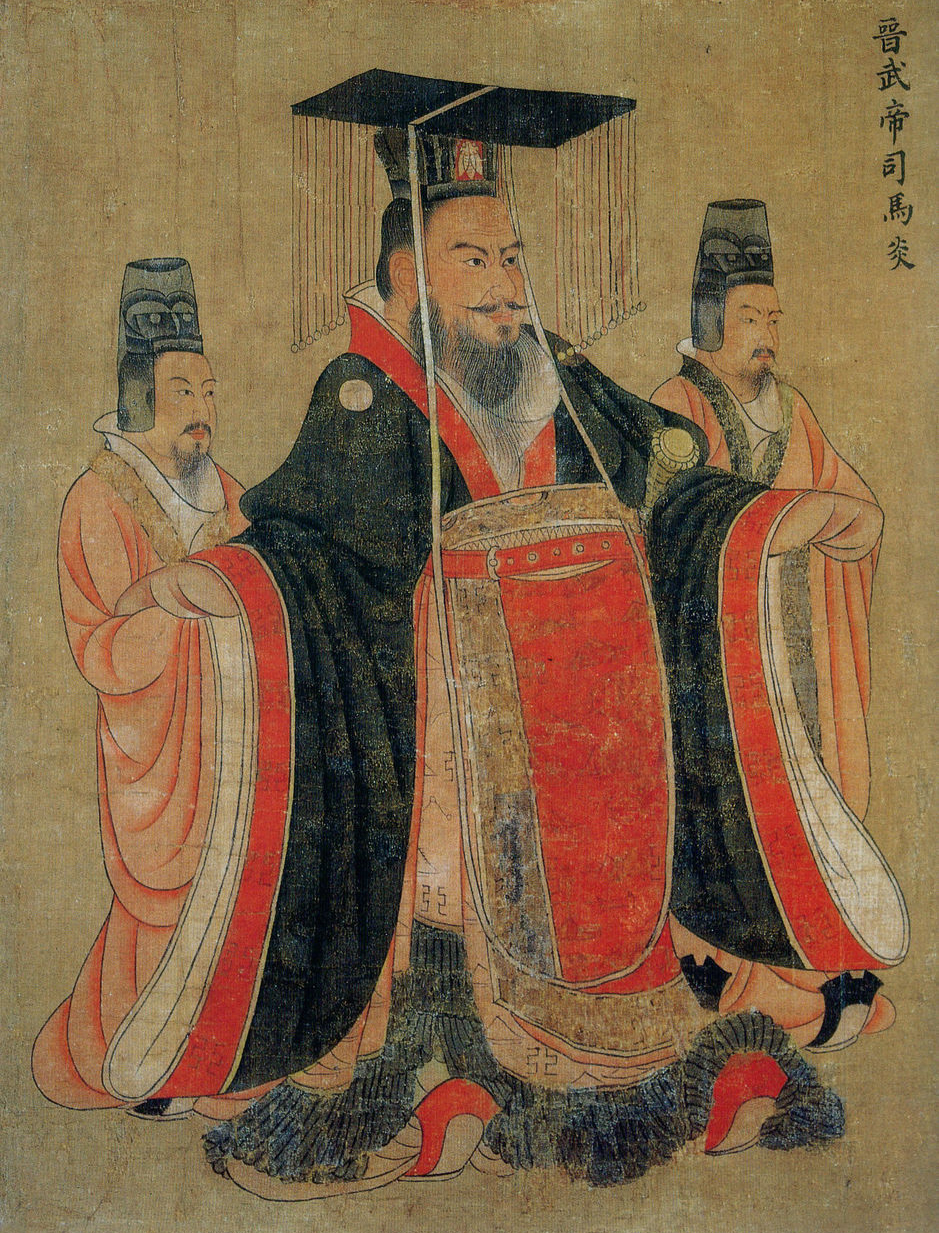
The mianfu of Emperor Wu of Jin dynasty, 7th-century painting by court artist Yan Liben

=== Ancient Burma (Pyu Period) ===
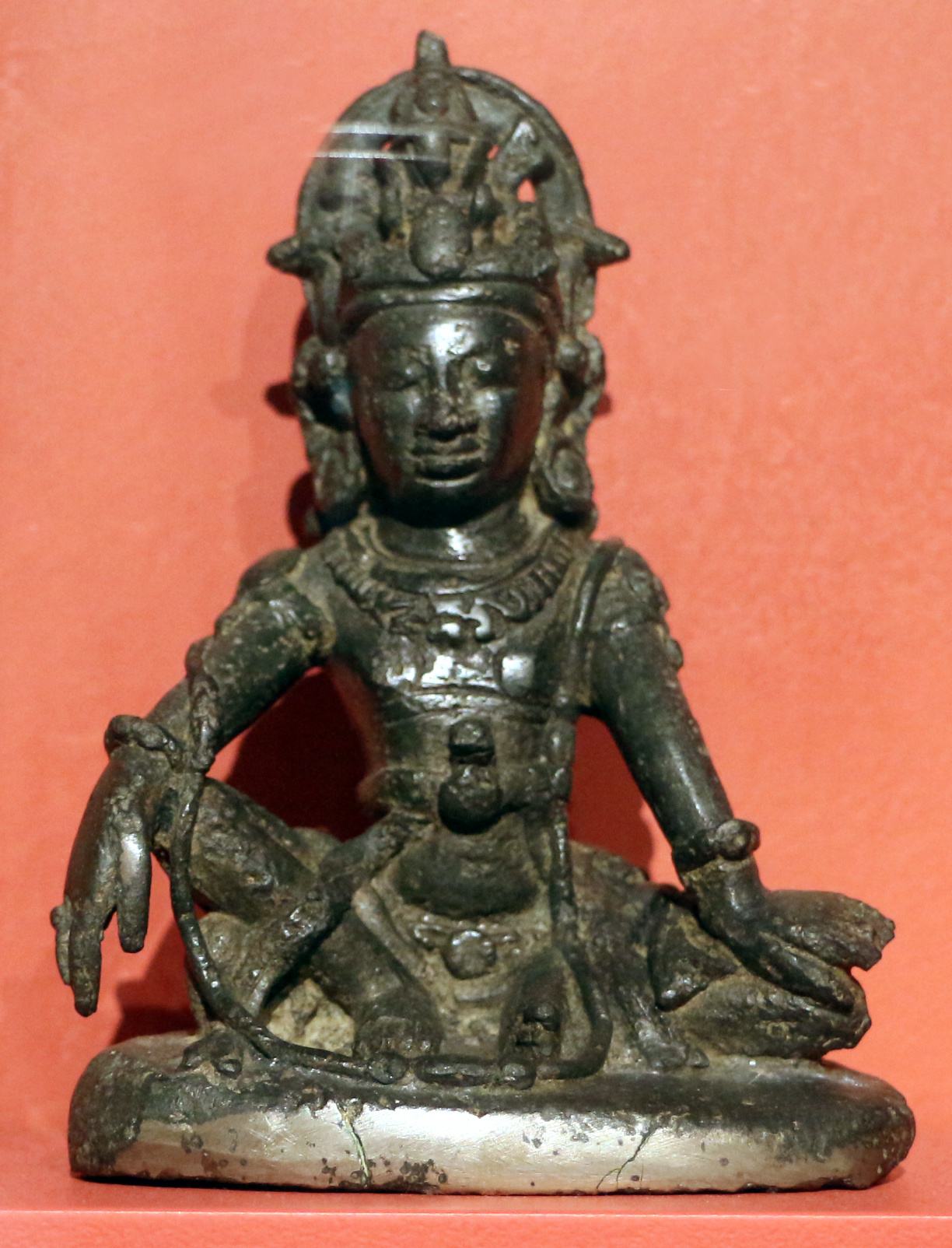
Maitreya the Bodhisattva in 7th century Pyu art

The Pyu culture, dominant in Upper Burma from the early centuries CE until the 9th century, presents some of the earliest known examples of dress and ornamentation in Myanmar history. Two major archaeological sites — Hanlin and Sri Ksetra — have yielded important insights into Pyu-era clothing and accessories.

Sculptures from Hanlin depict Pyu men wearing headwraps and sometimes crown-like headdresses, while women are shown with elaborate head ornaments similar to those seen later in the Bagan period. Though depictions of ear ornaments are relatively rare, wide, drooping earlobes suggest the use of heavy earrings or plugs. Jewelry such as large bead necklaces appears on both male and female figures. Clothing is rendered faintly, with garments seemingly made of thin material that clings to the body.

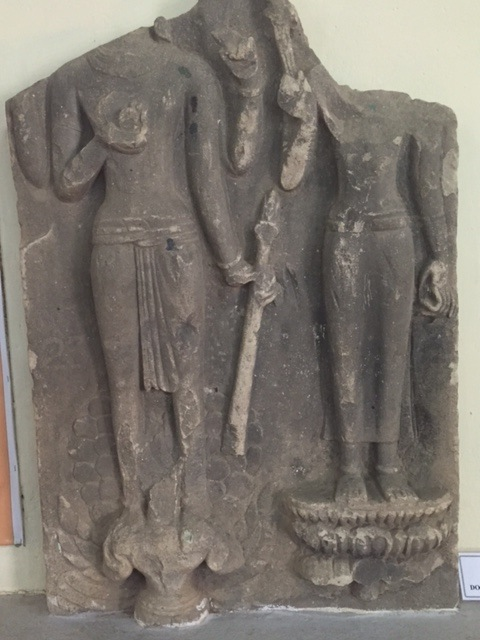
High-relief sculpture of Vishnu and Lakshmi from Sri Ksetra

Sculptural evidence from Sri Ksetra displays more clearly-defined clothing. Pyu women are shown wearing sarong-like skirts, some thin and form-fitting, others thicker and structured. Men appear in loose trousers tied with a belt or knotted sash, comparable to later Bagan-era attire. Some male figures are seen with faintly rendered upper cloth, and both men and women wear bracelets and large ear-ornaments.

Hairstyles are typically tied at the crown in topknots or buns, in line with Chinese records describing married Pyu women as styling their hair into buns decorated with silver or pearls. These same Chinese accounts note that Pyu people wore cotton rather than silk due to Buddhist values of non-violence, which discouraged the killing of silkworms. Elite women wore brightly colored skirts and light shawls and were often accompanied by attendants carrying fans.

=== Ancient Thailand ===
The earliest known evidence of spinning in Thailand comes from the archaeological site of Tha Kae located in Central Thailand. Tha Kae was inhabited from the end of the first millennium BC to the late first millennium AD. Here, archaeologists discovered 90 fragments of a spindle whorl dated from 3rd century BC to 3rd century AD. The shapes of these finds indicate connections with south China and India.

=== Ancient South America ===
The earliest textiles found in South America date back to an estimated 12,000 years ago. These textiles were excavated from the Guitarrero Cave in Peru. It is assumed that they were being used by settlers for a variety of creations like baskets and wall-coverings. Contrary to the assumptions that early raids in the Andes mountains were executed exclusively by men, Edward A. Jolie's research indicates that women must have been among these settlers as well. His reason for believing so is the general cultural connection of textile weaving being produced by women.

=== Ancient Japan ===
The earliest evidence of weaving in Japan is associated with the Jōmon period. This culture is defined by pottery decorated with cord patterns. In a shell mound in the Miyagi Prefecture, dating back about 5,500 year, some cloth fragments made from bark fibers were discovered. Hemp fibers were also discovered in the Torihama shell mound, Fukui Prefecture, dating back to the Jōmon period, suggesting that these plants could also have been used for clothing. Some pottery-pattern imprints depict also fine mat designs, indicating weaving techniques. The patterns on the Jōmon pottery show people wearing short upper garments, close-fitting trousers, funnel-sleeves, and rope-like belts. The depictions also show clothing with patterns that are embroidered or painted arched designs, though it is not apparent whether this indicates what the clothes look like or whether that simply happens to be the style of representation used. The pottery also shows no distinction between male and female garments. This may have been true because during that time period clothing was more for decoration than social distinction, but it might also just be because of the representation on the pottery rather than how people actually dressed at the time. Since bone needles were also found, it is assumed that the people wore dresses that were sewn together.

The followed the Japanese Yayoi period (c. 1000 BCE to c. 300 CE), during which rice cultivation developed. This led to a shift from hunter-gatherer communities to agrarian societies which had a large impact on clothing. According to Chinese literature from that time period, clothing more appropriate to agriculture began to be worn: for example, an unsewn length of fabric wrapped around the body, or a poncho-type garment with a head-hole cut into it. This same literature also indicates that pink or scarlet makeup was worn, but also that mannerisms between people of all ages and genders were not very different. However, this is debatable as there were probably cultural prejudices in the Chinese document. There is a common Japanese belief that the Yayoi time period was quite utopian before Chinese influence began to promote the use of clothing to indicate age and gender.

From 300 to 550 AD the Yamato period permits much of the clothing style to be derived from the artifacts of the time. The tomb statues (haniwa) especially indicate that clothing styles changed from the ones recorded by the Chinese accounts from the previous age. The statues usually wear a two-piece outfit that has an upper piece with a front opening and close-cut sleeves with loose trousers for men and a pleated skirt for women. Silk farming had been introduced by the Chinese by this time period, but due to silk's cost it would only be used by people of certain classes or ranks.

The following periods were the Asuka (550 to 646 AD) and Nara (646 to 794 AD) when Japan developed a more unified government and began to use Chinese laws and social rankings. The new laws required people to wear different styles and colors to indicate social status. Clothing became longer and wider in general and sewing methods were more advanced.

=== Classical period of the Philippines ===
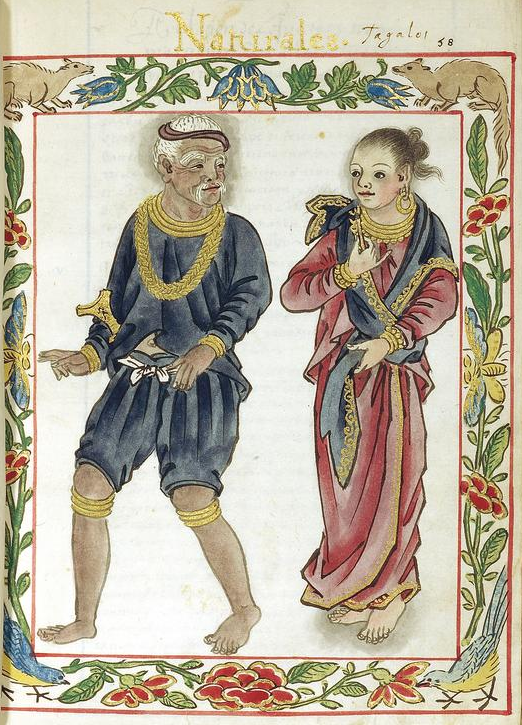
A 16th-century Boxer Codex image showing the attire of a Classical period Filipino, made of silk and cotton

The classical Filipino clothing varied according to cost and current fashions, and so indicated social standing. The basic garments were the bahag (loincloth) worn by men, and a sarong-like garment—known variously as malong or patadyong or tapis, depending on the region—worn by men and women. But more prestigious clothes, lihin-lihin, were added for public appearances and especially on formal occasions—blouses and tunics, loose smocks with sleeves, capes, or ankle-length robes. The textiles of which they were made were similarly varied. In ascending order of value, they were abaca, abaca decorated with colored cotton thread, cotton, cotton decorated with silk thread, silk, imported printstuff, and an elegant abaca woven of selected fibers almost as thin as silk. In addition, Antonio Pigafetta mentions both G-strings and skirts of barkcloth.

Untailored clothes, however had no particular names. Pandong could mean a lady's cloak or simply any natural covering, like the growth on banana trunk's or a natal caul. In Panay, the word kurong, meaning "curly hair", applied to any short skirt or blouse; and some better ones made of imported chintz or calico were simply called by the name of the cloth itself, tabas. So, too, the wraparound skirt which the Tagalogs called tapis was hardly considered a skirt at all: Visayans just called it habul (woven stuff) or halong (abaca) or even hulun (sash).

The usual male headdress was the pudong, a turban, though in Panay both men and women also wore a head cloth or bandana called saplung. Commoners wore pudong of rough abaca cloth wrapped around only a few turns so that it was more of a headband than a turban and was therefore called pudong-pudong — as the crowns and diadems on Christian images were later called. A red pudong was called magalong, and was the insignia of braves who had killed an enemy. The most prestigious kind of pudong, limited to the most valiant, was, like their G-strings, made of pinayusan, a gauze-thin abaca of fibers selected for their whiteness, tie-dyed a deep scarlet in patterns as fine as embroidery, and burnished to a silky sheen. Such pudong were lengthened with each additional feat of valor: real heroes therefore let one end hang loose with affected carelessness. Women generally wore a kerchief, called tubatub if it was pulled tight over the whole head; but they also had a broad-brimmed hat called sayap or tarindak, woven of sago-palm leaves. Some were evidently signs of rank: in 1521 when Humabon's queen went to hear mass during Ferdinand Magellan's visit, she was preceded by three girls carrying one of her hats. A headdress from Cebu with a deep crown, used by both sexes for travel on foot or by boat, was called sarok, which actually meant "to go for water".

=== Classical Greece and Rome ===
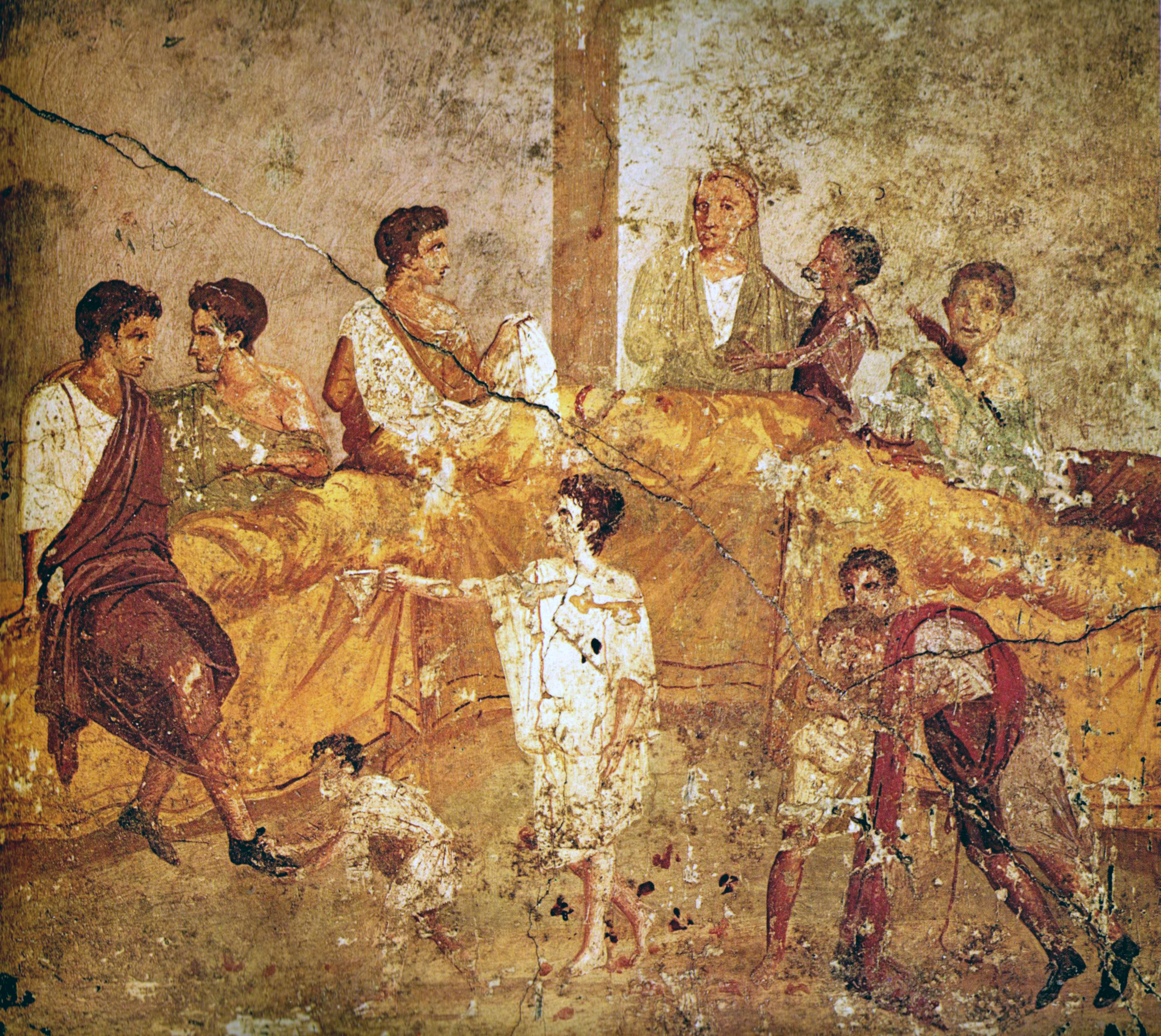
A multigenerational banquet depicted on a wall-painting from Pompeii, 1st century AD

Fabric in Ancient Greece was woven on a warp-weighted loom. The first extant image of weaving in western art is from a terracotta lekythos (narrow-necked jug for oil) c. 540 B.C.E., which depicts two women weaving at a warp-weighted loom. The warp threads, which run vertically to a bar at the top, are tied together with weights at the bottom, which hold them taut. The woman on the right runs the shuttle containing the weaving thread across the middle of the warp. The woman on the left uses a beater to consolidate the already-woven threads.

Dress in classical antiquity favored wide, unsewn lengths of fabric, pinned and draped to the body in various ways.

Ancient Greek clothing consisted of lengths of wool or linen, generally rectangular and secured at the shoulders with ornamented pins (which archaeologists call fibulae) and belted with a sash. Typical garments were the peplos, a loose robe worn by women; the chlamys, a cloak worn by men; and the chiton, a tunic worn by both men and women. Men's chitons hung to the knees, whereas women's chitons fell to their ankles. A long cloak called a himation was worn over the peplos or chlamys.

The toga of ancient Rome was also an unsewn length of wool cloth, worn by male citizens and draped around the body in various fashions, over a simple tunic. Early tunics were two simple rectangles joined at the shoulders and sides; later tunics had sewn sleeves. Women wore the draped stola or an ankle-length tunic, with a shawl-like palla as an outer garment. Wool was the preferred fabric, although linen, hemp, and small amounts of expensive imported silk and cotton were also worn.

=== Ancient Europe ===
==== Neolithic Age ====
Fabrics in European neolithic cultures were based on flax and bast fiber. The first wool textiles show up in the Late Neolithic period.

==== Bronze Age ====
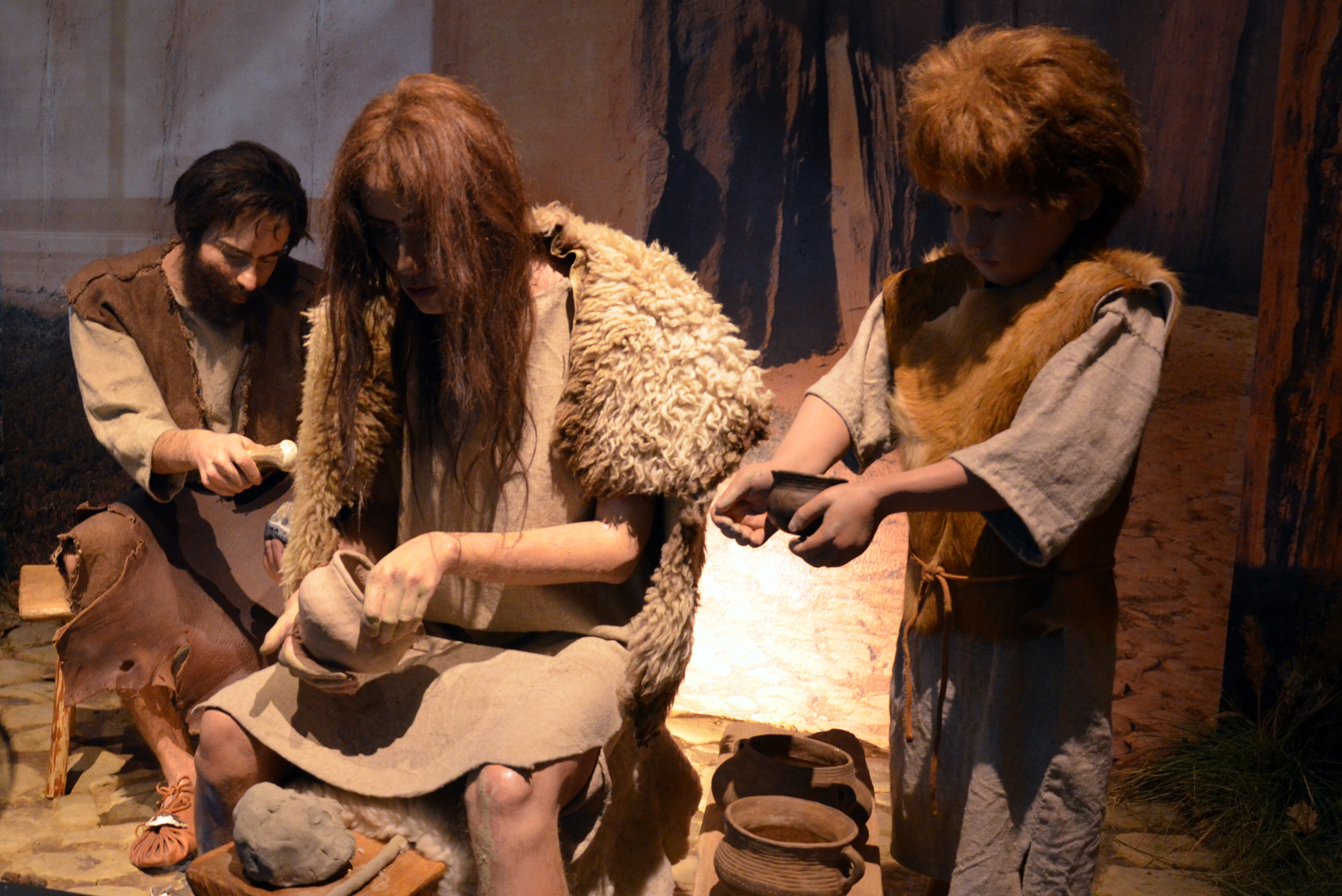
Reconstruction of people of the Mierzanowice culture from present-day Poland, c. 2100–1650 BC.

Scraps of wool fabric from the Bronze Age and Iron Age have been found in the salt mines of Hallstatt Austria. The fabric scraps were residuals of rags used in the mines. The rags, in turn were scraps from worn-out garments.

The Bronze-age fabrics are relatively coarse—in part due to the coarse wool available from the sheep at the time. The wool had a large amount of kemp (guard hairs). The weaves, however, included both simple plain weave and more sophisticated twill weave. Twill-woven fabrics have better drape than plain-woven ones. The fabric colors were both natural and dyed.

==== Iron Age ====
Iron-age fabrics are finer than those of the Bronze Age. The spun thread was very uniform and fine. Some iron-age fabrics also had patterns of stripes woven in. The finer fabric has been attributed to the development of breeds of sheep with finer wool and less kemp.

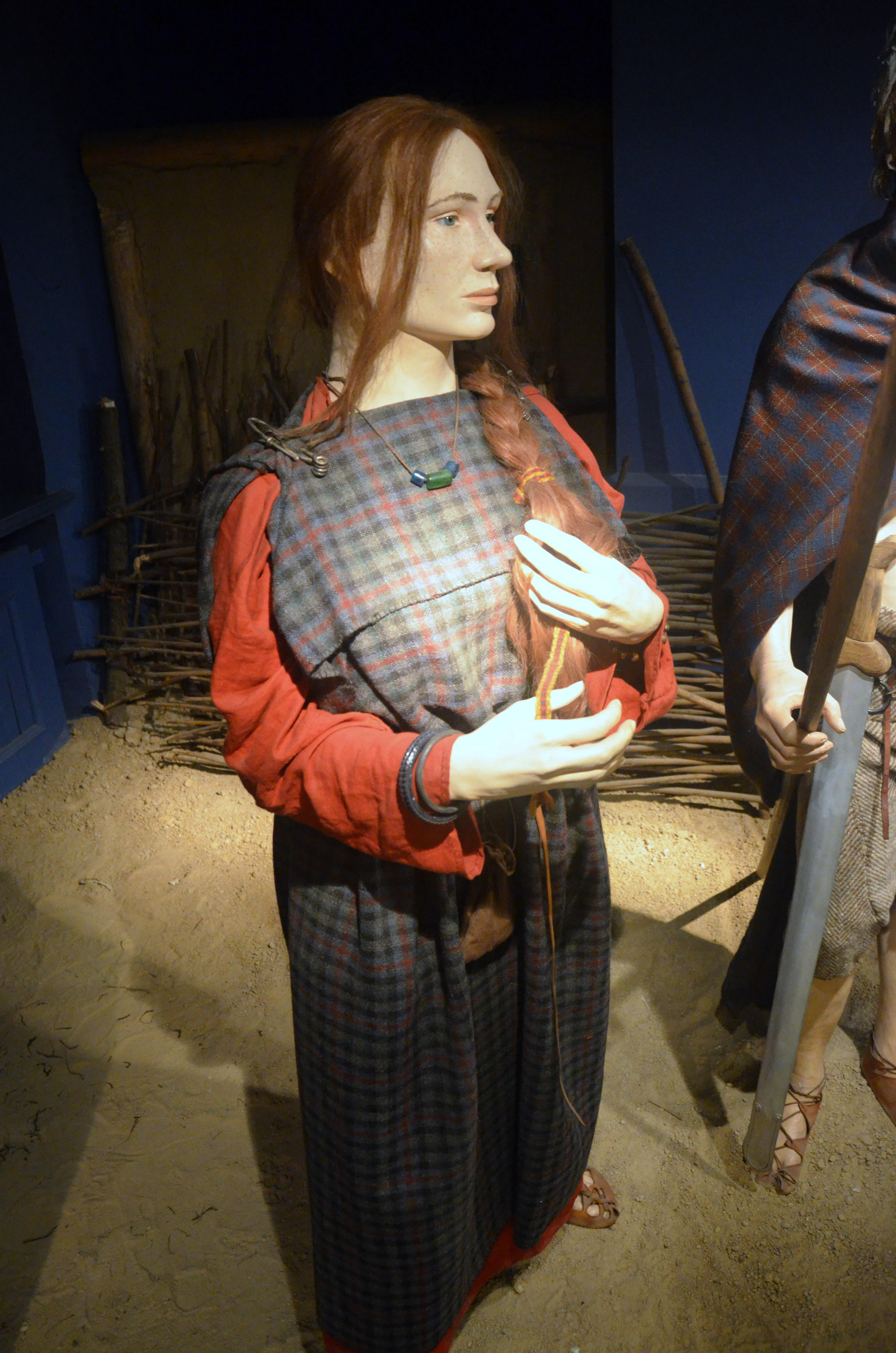
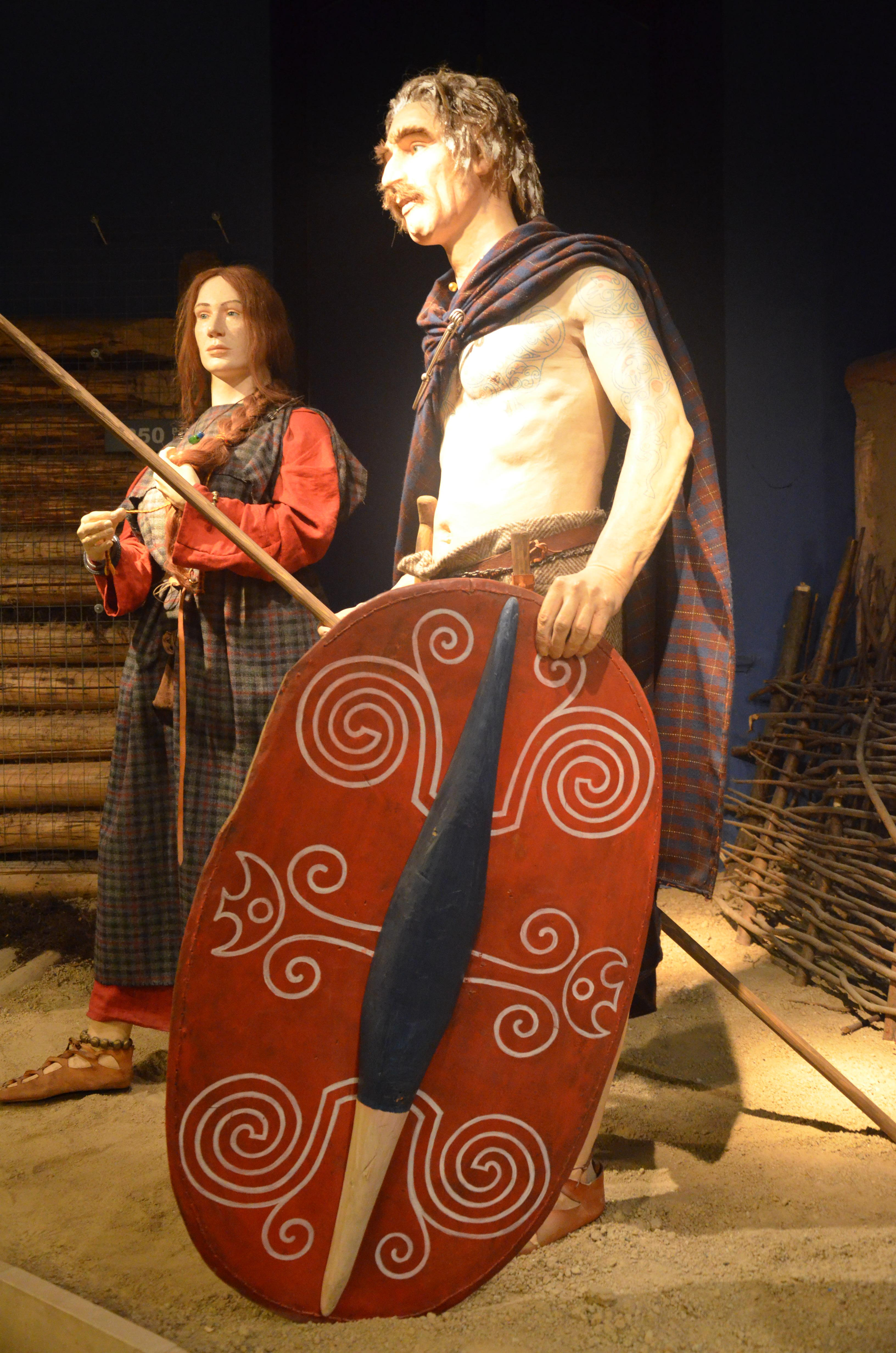
Celtic costumes from the La Tène period, third century BC

Other Iron-Age fabrics from northwestern Europe have been found on bodies preserved by the anaerobic and acidic conditions of peat bogs. A Danish recreation of clothing found with such bodies indicates woven wool dresses, tunics and skirts. These were largely unshaped and held in place with leather belts and metal brooches or pins. Garments were not always plain, but incorporated decoration with contrasting colours, particularly at the ends and edges of the garment. Men wore breeches, possibly with the lower legs wrapped for protection, although Boucher states that long trousers have also been found. Warmth came from woollen shawls and capes of animal skin, probably worn with the fur facing inwards for added comfort. Caps were worn, also made from skins, and there was an emphasis on hair arrangements, from braids to elaborate Suebian knots. Soft laced shoes made from leather protected the feet.

Patterns and methods for re-creation of examples of garments of this period highlight the construction techniques, tools, and skills of the makers of this era.

== Medieval clothing and textiles ==
The history of Medieval European clothing and textiles has inspired a good deal of scholarly interest in the 21st century. Elisabeth Crowfoot, Frances Pritchard, and Kay Staniland authored Textiles and Clothing: Medieval Finds from Excavations in London, c.1150-c.1450 (Boydell Press, 2001). The topic is also the subject of an annual series, Medieval Clothing and Textiles (Boydell Press), edited by Robin Netherton and Gale R. Owen-Crocker, emeritus Professor of Anglo-Saxon Culture at the University of Manchester.

=== Byzantium ===
The Byzantines made and exported very richly patterned cloth, woven and embroidered for the upper classes, and resist-dyed and printed for the lower. By Justinian's time the Roman toga had been replaced by the tunica, or long chiton, for both sexes, over which the upper classes wore various other garments, like a dalmatica (dalmatic), a heavier and shorter type of tunica; short and long cloaks were fastened on the right shoulder.

Leggings and hose were often worn, but are not prominent in depictions of the wealthy; they were associated with barbarians, whether European or Persian.

=== Early medieval Europe ===
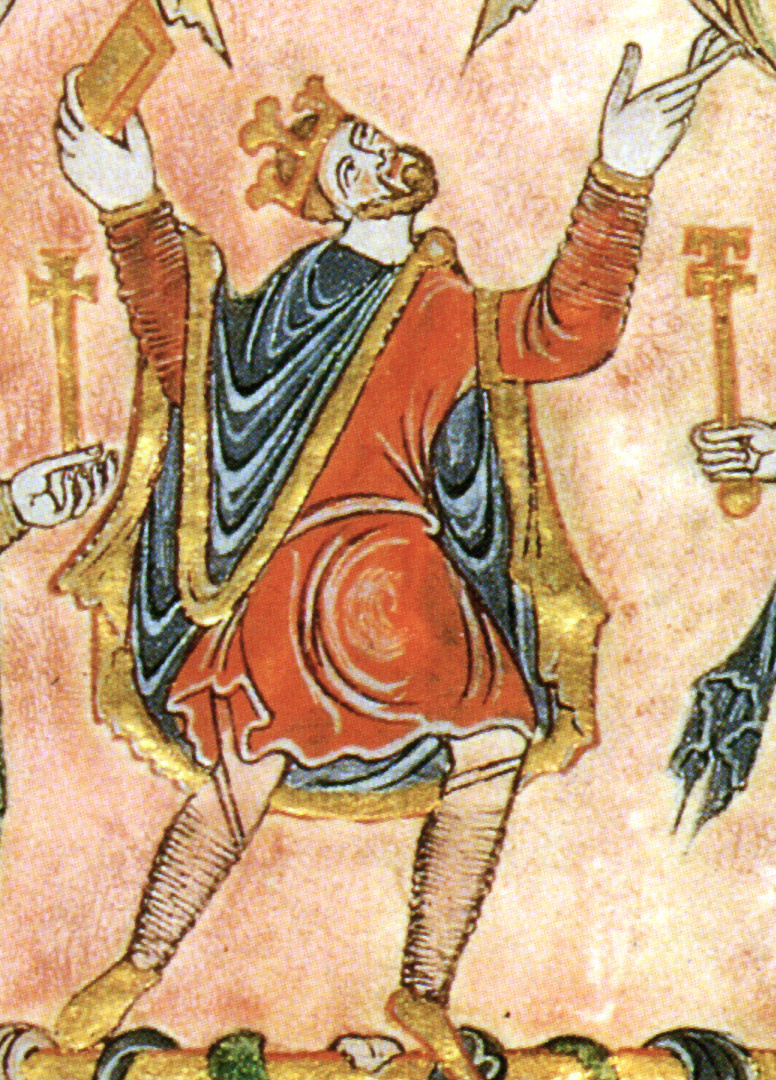
Edgar I of England in short tunic, hose, and cloak, 966

European dress changed gradually in the years 400 to 1100. People in many countries dressed differently depending on whether they identified with the old Romanised population, or the new invading populations such as Franks, Anglo-Saxons, and Visigoths. Men of the invading peoples generally wore short tunics, with belts, and visible trousers, hose or leggings. The Romanised populations, and the Church, remained faithful to the longer tunics of Roman formal costume.

The elite imported silk cloth from the Byzantine, and later Muslim, worlds, and also probably cotton. They also could afford bleached linen and dyed and simply patterned wool woven in Europe itself. But embroidered decoration was probably very widespread, though not usually detectable in art. Lower classes wore local or homespun wool, often undyed, trimmed with bands of decoration, variously embroidery, tablet-woven bands, or colorful borders woven into the fabric in the loom.

=== High Middle Ages and the rise of fashion ===
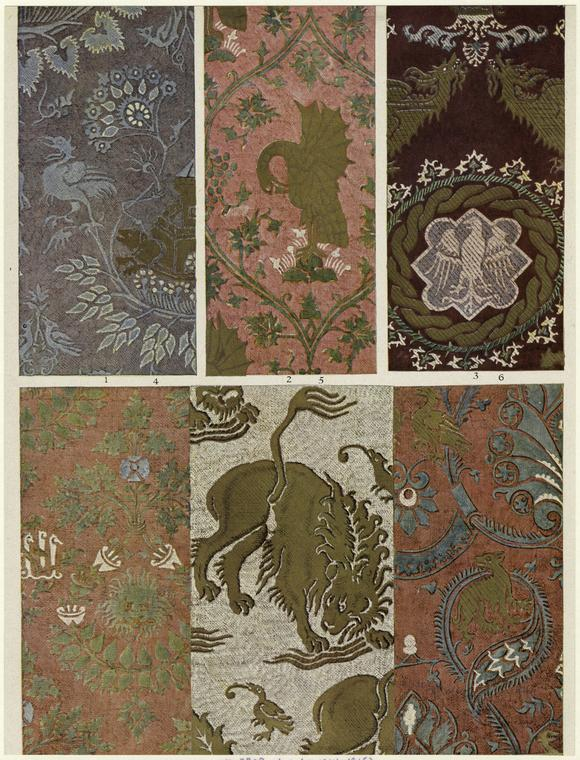
14th-century Italian silk damasks

Clothing in 12th and 13th century Europe remained very simple for both men and women, and quite uniform across the subcontinent. The traditional combination of short tunic with hose for working-class men and long tunic with overdress for women and upper-class men remained the norm. Most clothing, especially outside the wealthier classes, remained little changed from three or four centuries earlier.

The 13th century saw great progress in the dyeing and working of wool, which was by far the most important material for outerwear. Linen was increasingly used for clothing that was directly in contact with the skin. Unlike wool, linen could be laundered and bleached in the sun. Cotton, imported raw from Egypt and elsewhere, was used for padding and quilting, and cloths such as buckram and fustian.

Crusaders returning from the Levant brought knowledge of its fine textiles, including light silks, to Western Europe. In Northern Europe, silk was an imported and very expensive luxury. The well-off could afford woven brocades from Italy or even further afield. Fashionable Italian silks of this period featured repeating patterns of roundels and animals, deriving from Ottoman silk-weaving centres in Bursa, and ultimately from Yuan Dynasty China via the Silk Road.

Cultural and costume historians agree that the mid-14th century marks the emergence of recognizable "fashion" in Europe. From this century onwards, Western fashion changed at a pace quite unknown to other civilizations, whether ancient or contemporary. In most other cultures, only major political changes, such as the Muslim conquest of India, produced radical changes in clothing, and in China, Japan, and the Ottoman Empire fashion changed only slightly over periods of several centuries.

In this period, the draped garments and straight seams of previous centuries were replaced by curved seams and the beginnings of tailoring, which allowed clothing to more closely fit the human form, as did the use of lacing and buttons. A fashion for mi-parti or parti-coloured garments made of two contrasting fabrics, one on each side, arose for men in mid-century, and was especially popular at the English court. Sometimes just the hose would have different colours on each leg.

== Renaissance and early modern period ==
=== Renaissance Europe ===
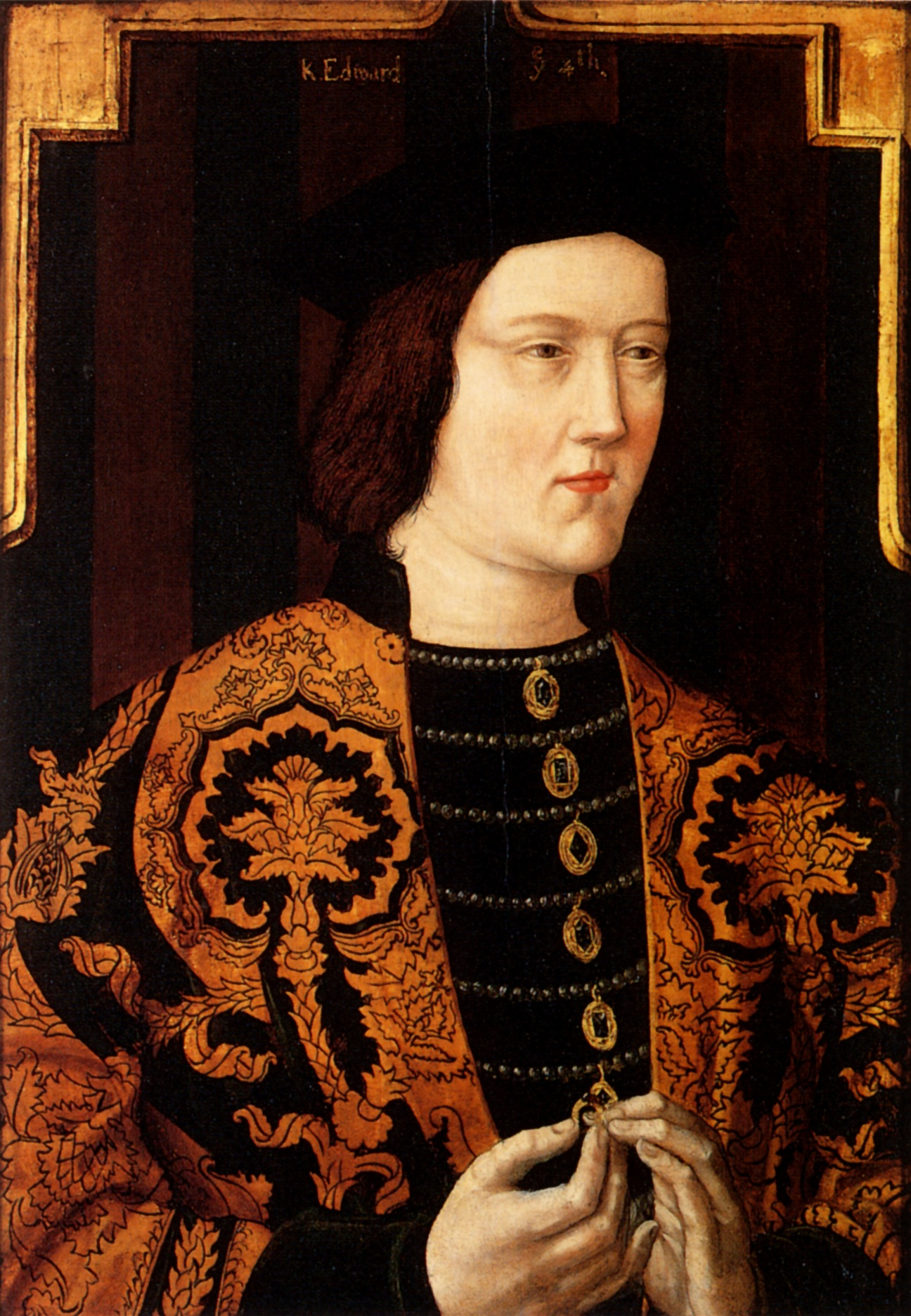
Bold floral patterned silks, 15th century

Wool remained the most popular fabric for all classes, followed by linen and hemp. Wool fabrics were available in a wide range of qualities, from rough undyed cloth to fine, dense broadcloth with a velvety nap; high-value broadcloth was a backbone of the English economy and was exported throughout Europe. Wool fabrics were dyed in rich colours, notably reds, greens, golds, and blues.

Silk-weaving was well established around the Mediterranean by the beginning of the 15th century, and figured silks, often silk velvets with silver-gilt wefts, are increasingly seen in Italian dress and in the dress of the wealthy throughout Europe. Stately floral designs featuring a pomegranate or artichoke motif had reached Europe from China in the previous century and became a dominant design in the Ottoman silk-producing cities of Istanbul and Bursa, and spread to silk weavers in Florence, Genoa, Venice, Valencia and Seville in this period.

As prosperity grew in the 15th century, the urban middle classes, including skilled workers, began to wear more complex clothes that followed, at a distance, the fashions set by the elites. National variations in clothing increased over the century.

=== Early Modern Europe ===
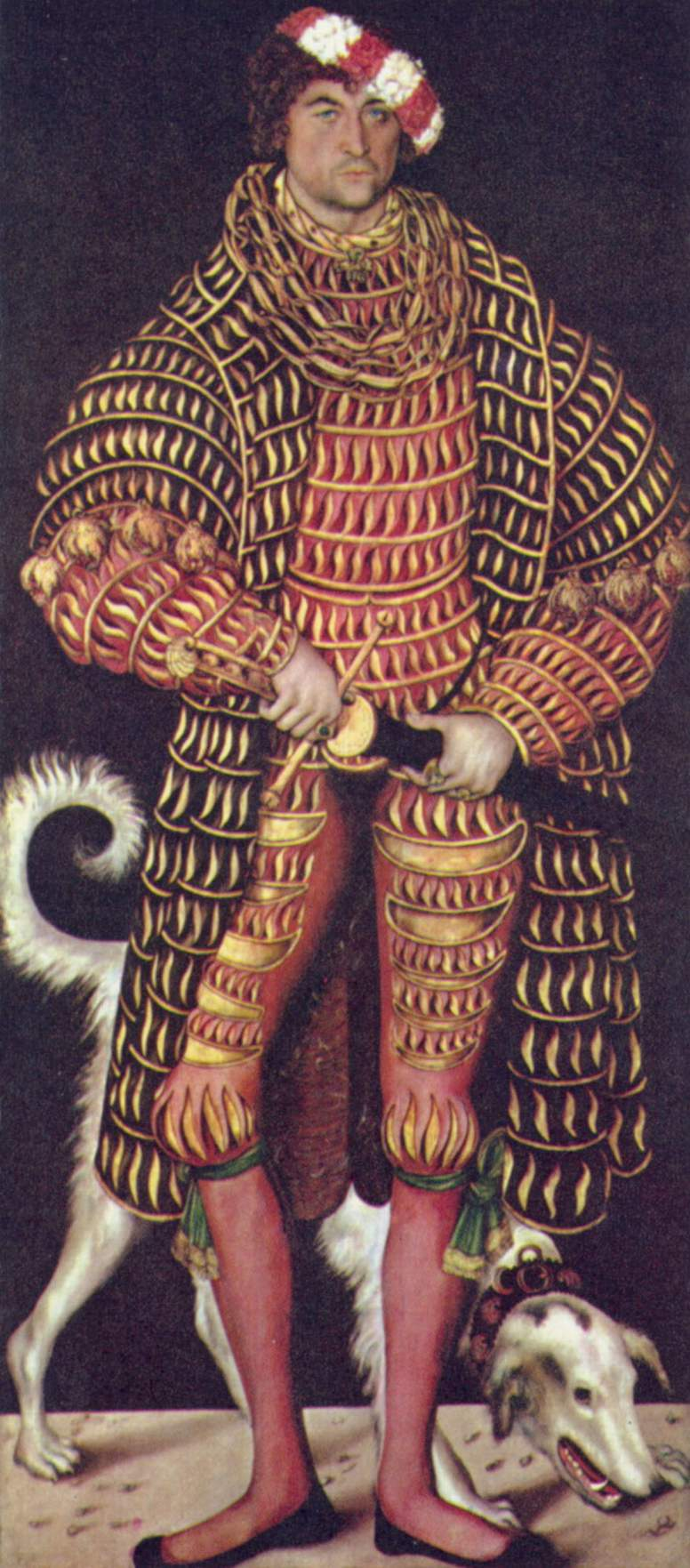
Slashing at its height: Henry IV, Duke of Saxony, c. 1514

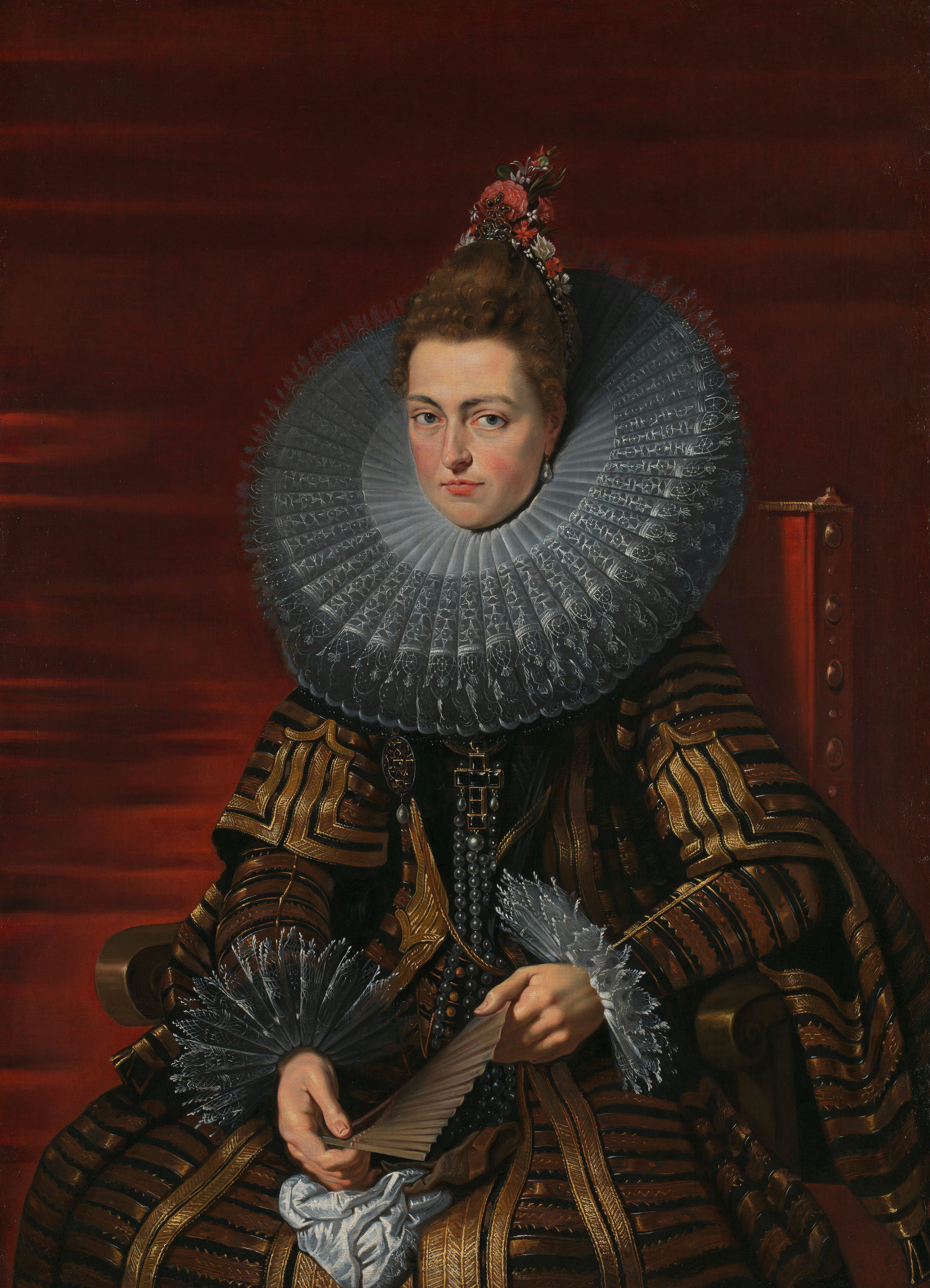
A French reinterpretation of Spanish fashion, with elaborate reticella ruff, 1609

By the first half of the 16th century, the clothing of the Low Countries, German states, and Scandinavia had developed in a different direction than that of England, France, and Italy, although all absorbed the sobering and formal influence of Spanish dress after the mid-1520s.

Elaborate slashing was popular, especially in Germany. Black was increasingly worn for the most formal occasions. Bobbin lace arose from passementerie in the mid-16th century, probably in Flanders. This century also saw the rise of the ruff, which grew from a mere ruffle at the neckline of the shirt or chemise to immense cartwheel shapes. At their most extravagant, ruffs required wire supports.

By the turn of the 17th century, a sharp distinction could be seen between the sober fashions favored by Protestants in England and the Netherlands, which still showed heavy Spanish influence, and the light, revealing fashions of the French and Italian courts.

The great flowering of needlelace occurred in this period. Geometric reticella deriving from cutwork was elaborated into true needlelace or punto in aria (called in England "point lace"), which reflected the scrolling floral designs popular for embroidery. Lacemaking centers were established in France to reduce the outflow of cash to Italy.

According to Wolf D. Fuhrig, "By the second half of the 17th century, Silesia had become an important economic pillar of the Habsburg monarchy, largely on the strength of its textile industry."

=== Mughal India ===
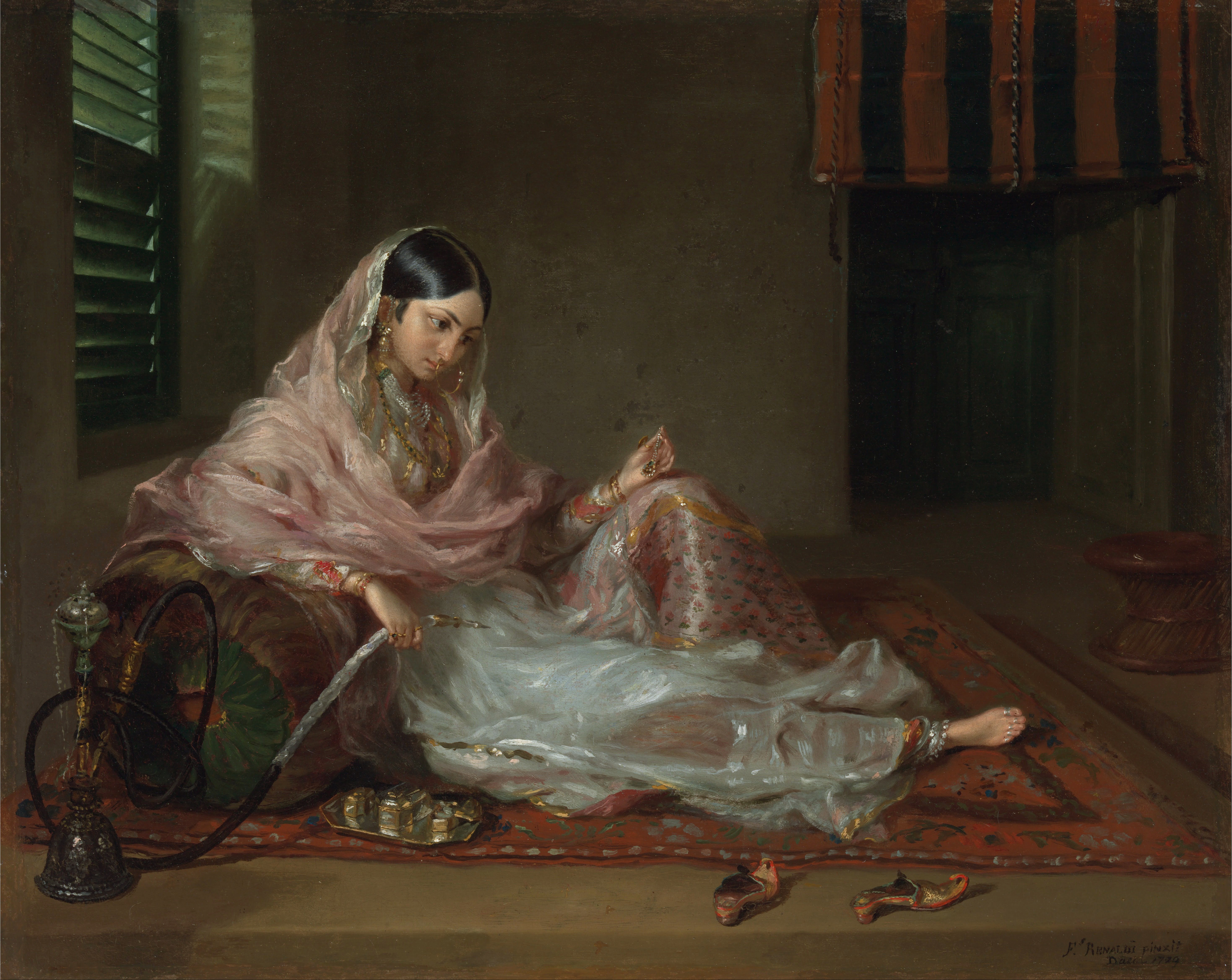
A woman in Bengal region in the eastern part of the Indian subcontinent, clad in fine Bengali muslin, 18th century.

Mughal India (16th to 18th centuries) was the most important center of manufacturing in international trade up until the 18th century. Up until 1750, India produced about 25% of the world's industrial output. The largest manufacturing industry in Mughal India was textile manufacturing, particularly cotton textile manufacturing, which included the production of piece goods, calicos, and muslins, available unbleached and in a variety of colours. The cotton textile industry was responsible for a large part of India's international trade. India had a 25% share of the global textile trade in the early 18th century. Indian cotton textiles were the most important manufactured goods in world trade in the 18th century, consumed across the world from the Americas to Japan. The most important center of cotton production was the Bengal Subah province, particularly around its capital city of Dhaka.

Bengal accounted for more than 50% of textiles and around 80% of silks imported by the Dutch from Asia, Bengali silk and cotton textiles were exported in large quantities to Europe, Indonesia, and Japan, and Bengali muslin textiles from Dhaka were sold in Central Asia, where they were known as "daka" textiles. Indian textiles dominated the Indian Ocean trade for centuries, were sold in the Atlantic Ocean trade, and had a 38% share of the West African trade in the early 18th century, while Indian calicos were major force in Europe, and Indian textiles accounted for 20% of total English trade with Southern Europe in the early 18th century.

In early modern Europe, there was significant demand for textiles from Mughal India, including cotton textiles and silk products. European fashion, for example, became increasingly dependent on Mughal Indian textiles and silks. In the late 17th and early 18th centuries, Mughal India accounted for 95% of British imports from Asia.

Emphasis was placed on the adornment of women. Even though the purdah was made compulsory for the Mughal women, we see that this did not stop themselves from experimenting in style and attire. Abul Fazal mentions that there were sixteen components that adorned a woman. These not only included clothing but also other aspects like that of oiling the body and iqtar. Mughal women wore long loose jamas with full sleeves and in winters it was accompanied by a Qaba or a Kashmir shawl used as a coat. Women were very fond of their perfumes and scents. Jewellery in the Mughal tradition signified not only religious values but also style statements.

=== Pre-Colonial North America ===
Across North America, native people constructed clothing using natural fibers such as cotton and agave as well as leather skins from animals such as deer or beavers. When traders and colonists came from Europe, they brought with them sheep and travelers highly valued the beaver pelts in particular for their warmth. Beaver pelt trade was one of the first commercial endeavors of colonial North America and a cause of the Beaver Wars.

== Enlightenment and the Colonial period ==
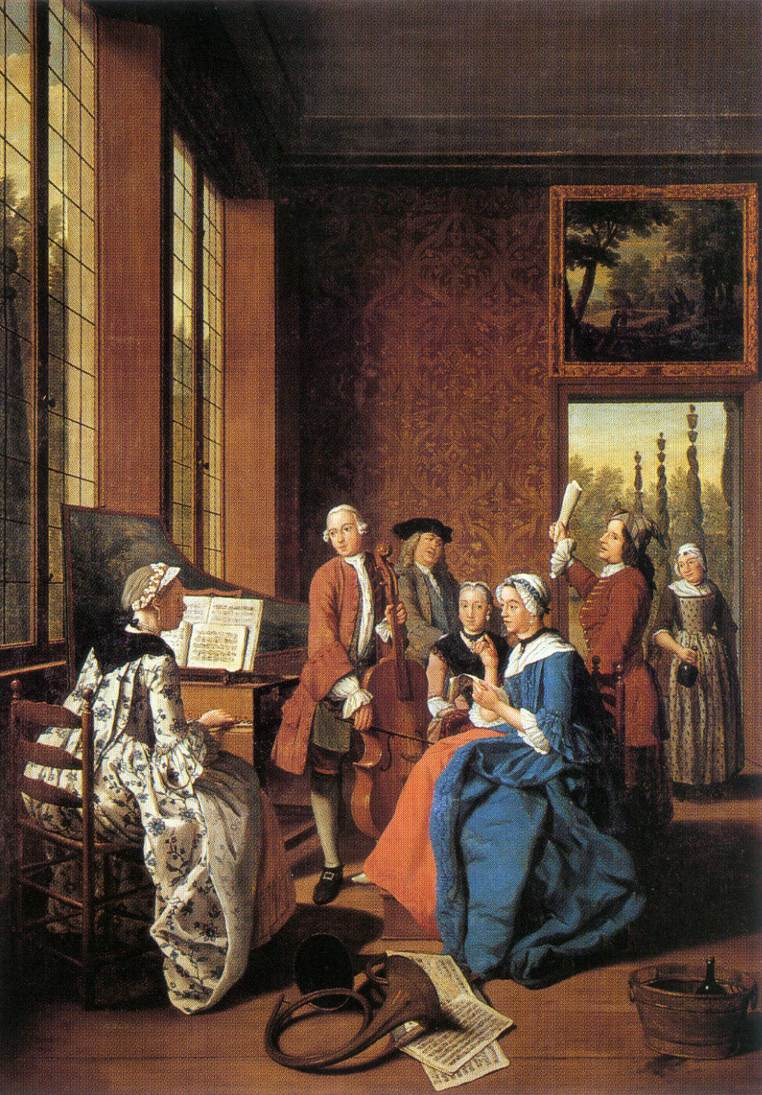
A Concert in an Interior by Jan Josef Horemans the Younger of Antwerp, 1764. The women's sack-back gowns and the men's coats over long waistcoats are characteristic of this period.

During the 18th century, distinction was made between full dress worn at Court and for formal occasions, and undress or everyday, daytime clothes. As the decades progressed, fewer and fewer occasions called for full dress which had all but disappeared by the end of the century. Full dress followed the styles of the French court, where rich silks and elaborate embroidery reigned. Men continued to wear the coat, waistcoat and breeches for both full dress and undress; these were now sometimes made of the same fabric and trim, signalling the birth of the three-piece suit.

Women's silhouettes featured small, domed hoops in the 1730s and early 1740s, which were displaced for formal court wear by side hoops or panniers which later widened to as much as three feet to either side at the court of Marie Antoinette. Fashion reached heights of fantasy and abundant ornamentation, before new enthusiasms for outdoor sports and country pursuits and a long-simmering movement toward simplicity and democratization of dress under the influence of Jean-Jacques Rousseau and the American Revolution led to an entirely new mode and the triumph of British woollen tailoring following the French Revolution.

For women's dresses, Indian cottons, especially printed chintzes, were imported to Europe in large numbers, and towards the end of the period simple white muslin dresses were in fashion.

== The Great Male Renunciation ==
The Great Male Renunciation (French: Grande Renonciation masculine) is the historical phenomenon at the end of the 18th century in which wealthy Western men stopped using bright colors, elaborate shapes and variety in their dress, which were left to women's clothing. Instead, men concentrated on minute differences of cut, and the quality of the plain cloth.

Coined by British psychologist John Flügel in 1930, it is considered a major turning point in the history of clothing, in which the men relinquished their claim to adornment and beauty.

== Industrial Revolution ==
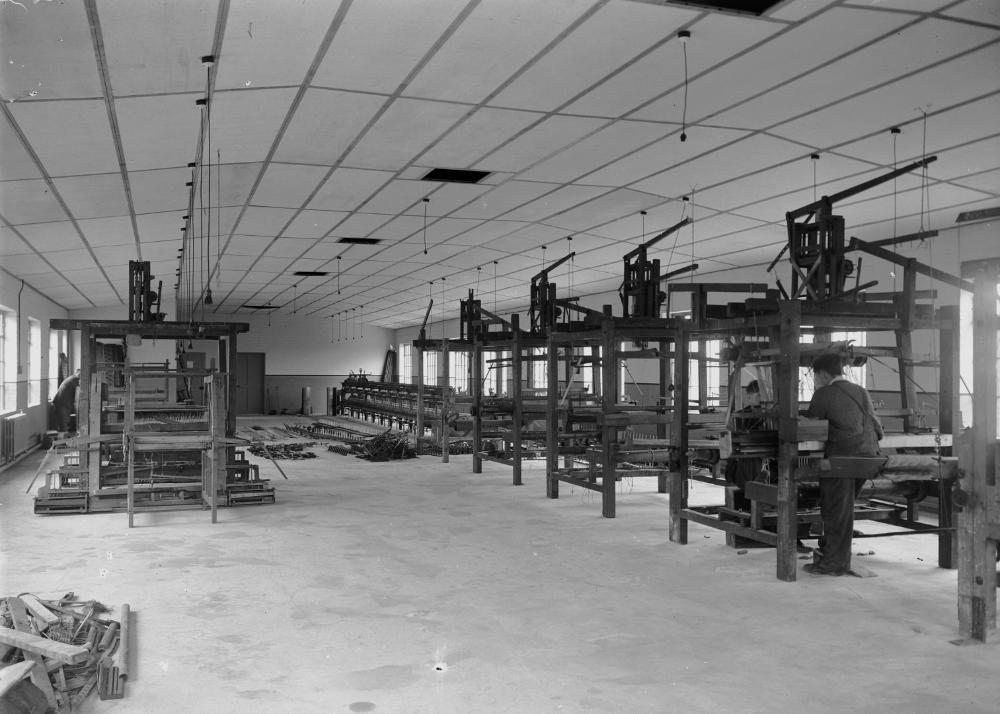
Textile machinery at the Cambrian Factory, Llanwrtyd, Wales in the 1940s

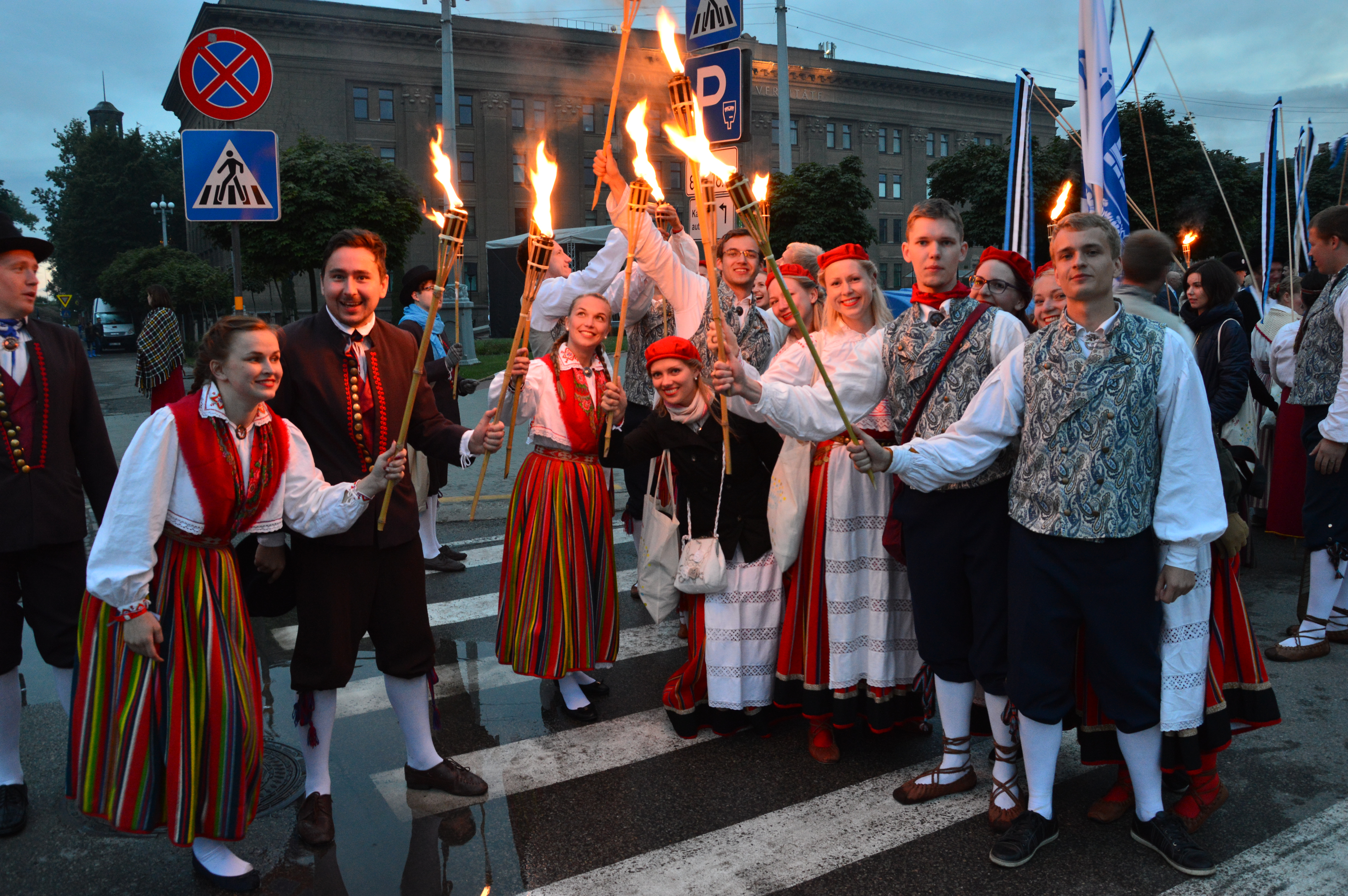
Estonian national clothes are a fine example of change in clothing after the Industrial Revolution. They changed considerably during 18th and 19th century with the addition of new types of colors (like aniline dyes), placement of colors (like lengthwise stripes) and with the addition of new elements (like waistcoats). By the end of the 19th century they went out of use in most of the country (except more remote places as in Kihnu island) and it was only in mid 20th century when they once again gained popularity and now as a formal clothing. Members of University of Tartu Folk Art Ensemble wearing clothes specific to Kihnu island, Tori Parish (women in red skirts) and Tõstamaa area (men in brown clothing).

During the Industrial Revolution, fabric production was mechanised with machines powered by waterwheels and steam-engines. Production shifted from small cottage based production to mass production based on assembly line organisation. Clothing production, on the other hand, continued to be made by hand.

Sewing machines emerged in the 19th century streamlining clothing production.

Textiles were not only made in factories. Before this, they were made in local and national markets. Dramatic change in transportation throughout the nation is one source that encouraged the use of factories. New advances such as steamboats, canals, and railroads lowered shipping costs which caused people to buy cheap goods that were produced in other places instead of more expensive goods that were produced locally. Between 1810 and 1840, the development of a national market prompted manufacturing which tripled the output's worth. This increase in production created a change in industrial methods, such as the use of factories instead of handmade woven materials that families usually made.

The vast majority of the people who worked in the factories were women. Women went to work in textile factories for a number of reasons. Some women left home to live on their own because of crowding at home; or to save for future marriage portions. The work enabled them to see more of the world, to earn something in anticipation of marriage, and to ease the crowding within the home. They also did it to make money for family back home. The money they sent home was to help out with the trouble some of the farmers were having. They also worked in the millhouses because they could gain a sense of independence and growth as a personal goal.

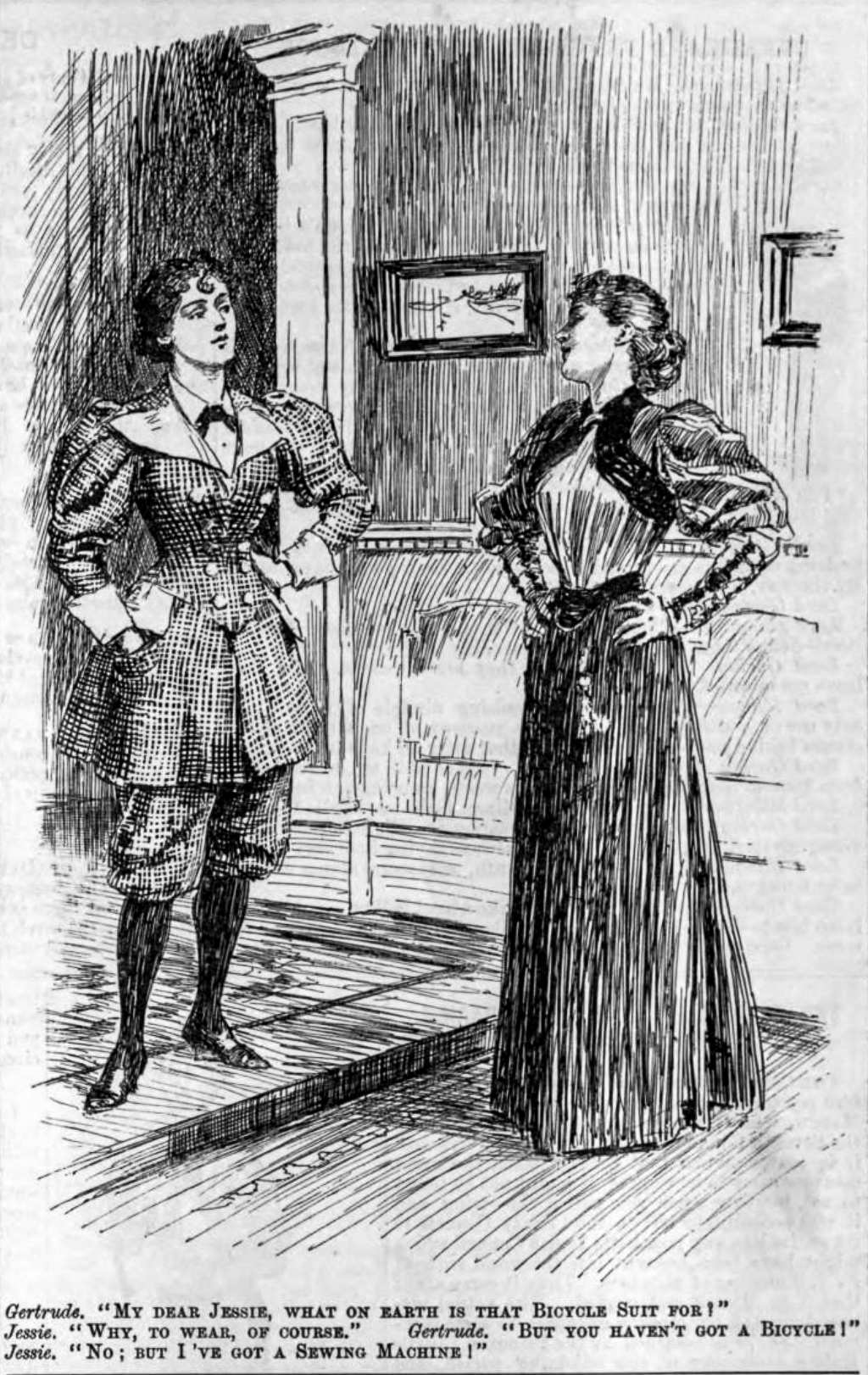
1895 Punch cartoon. Gertrude: "My dear Jessie, what on earth is that Bicycle Suit for?" Jessie: "Why, to wear, of course." Gertrude: "But you haven't got a Bicycle!" Jessie: "No; but I've got a Sewing Machine!"

Female fashion in the 1850s through the 1880s accented large crinolines, cumbersome bustles, and padded busts with tiny waists laced into 'steam-moulded corsetry'. 'Tight-lacing' became part of the corset controversy: dress reformists claimed that the corset was prompted by vanity and foolishness, and harmful to health. The reported health risks included damaged and rearranged internal organs, compromised fertility; weakness and general depletion of health. Those who were pro-corset argued that it was required for stylish dress and had its own unique pleasures; dress historian David Kunzle theorized that some enthusiastic fans of tightlacing may have experienced sexual pleasure when tightlacing, or by rubbing against the front of the corset, which contributed to the moral outrage against the practice. Doctors such as Alice Bunker Stockham counseled patients against them, particularly during maternity; reformist and activist Catharine Beecher was one of the few to defy propriety norms and discuss the gynecological issues resulting from lifelong corset usage, in particular uterine prolapse. Feminist historian Leigh Summers theorized that some moral panic derived from the common but unspeakable idea that tightlacing could be used to induce an abortion.

American women active in the anti-slavery and temperance movements, having experience in public speaking and political agitation, demanded sensible clothing that would not restrict their movement. While supporters of fashionable dress contended that corsets maintained an upright, 'good figure', as a necessary physical structure for moral and well-ordered society, these dress reformists contested that women's fashions were not only physically detrimental, but "the results of male conspiracy to make women subservient by cultivating them in slave psychology." They believed a change in fashions could change the whole position of women, allowing for greater social mobility, independence from men and marriage, the ability to work for wages, as well as physical movement and comfort.

The dress reform movement had its greatest success in the reform of women's undergarments, which could be modified without exposing the wearer to social ridicule. Dress reformers were also influential in persuading women to adopt simplified garments for athletic activities such as bicycling or swimming. The movement was much less concerned with men's clothing, although it initiated the widespread adoption of knitted wool union suits or long johns.

== 20th-century developments ==
The 20th century is marked by new applications for textiles as well as inventions in synthetic fibers and computerized manufacturing control systems.

=== Unions ===
In the early 20th century, workers in the clothing and textile industries became unionized in the United States.

=== Education ===
In the 20th century, the industry had expanded to such a degree that such educational institutions as UC Davis established a Division of Textiles and Clothing, The University of Nebraska–Lincoln also created a Department of Textiles, Clothing and Design that offers a Masters of Arts in Textile History, and Iowa State University established a Department of Textiles and Clothing that features a History of costume collection, 1865–1948. The Smith College Historic Clothing Collection, maintained by the college's theater department, houses 3000 items, everyday type clothing often overlooked by collections that focus on items that are considered unique or otherwise of interest.

Even high school libraries have collections on the history of clothing and textiles.

=== New applications ===
The changing lifestyles, activities, and demands of the 20th century favored clothing producers who could more effectively make their products have desired properties, such as increased strength, elasticity, or durability. These properties may be implemented through mechanical solutions such as different weaving and knitting patterns, by modifications to the fibers, or by finishing (textiles) of the textiles. Since the 1960s, it has been possible to finish textiles to resist stains, flames, wrinkles, and microbial life. Advancement in dye technology allowed for coloring of previously difficult-to-dye natural fibers and synthetic fibers.

=== Synthetic fibers ===
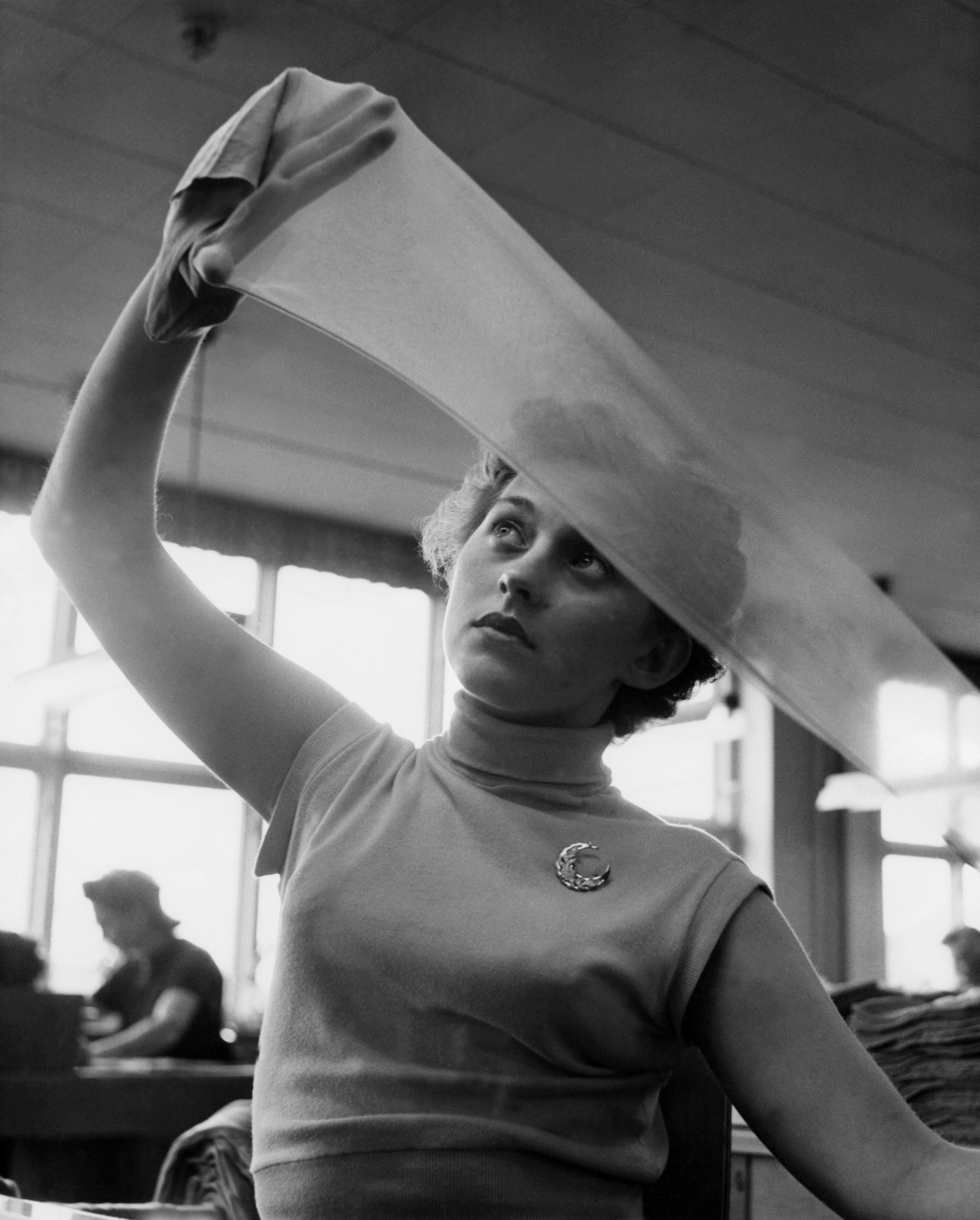
Nylon stockings being inspected in Malmö, Sweden, in 1954

Following the invention of plastics by petroleum and chemical corporations, fibers could now be made synthetically. Advancements in fiber spinning actuators and control systems allow control over fiber diameter and shape, so synthetic fiber may be engineered with more precision than natural fibers. Fibers invented between 1930 and 1970 include nylon, PTFE, polyester, Spandex, and Kevlar. Clothing producers soon adopted synthetic fibers, often using blends of different fibers for optimized properties. Synthetic fibers can be knit and woven similarly to natural fibers. Synthetic fibers are made by humans through chemical synthesis as opposed to natural fibers.

=== Automation and numeric control ===
The early 20th century continued the advances of the Industrial Revolution. The procedural loops required for mechanized textile knitting and weaving already used logic encoded in punch-cards and tapes. Since the machines were already computers, the invention of small-scale electronics and microcontrollers did not immediately change the possible functions of these machines. In the 1960s, existing machines became outfitted with computerized numeric control (CNC) systems, enabling more accurate and efficient actuation. In 1983, Bonas Machine Company Ltd. presented the first computer-controlled, electronic, Jacquard loom. In 1988, the first US patent was awarded for a "pick and place" robot. Advancements such as these changed the nature of work for machine operators, introducing computer literacy as a skill alongside machine literacy. Advances in sensing technology and data processing of the 20th century include the spectrophotometer for color matching and automatic inspection machines.

== 21st century ==
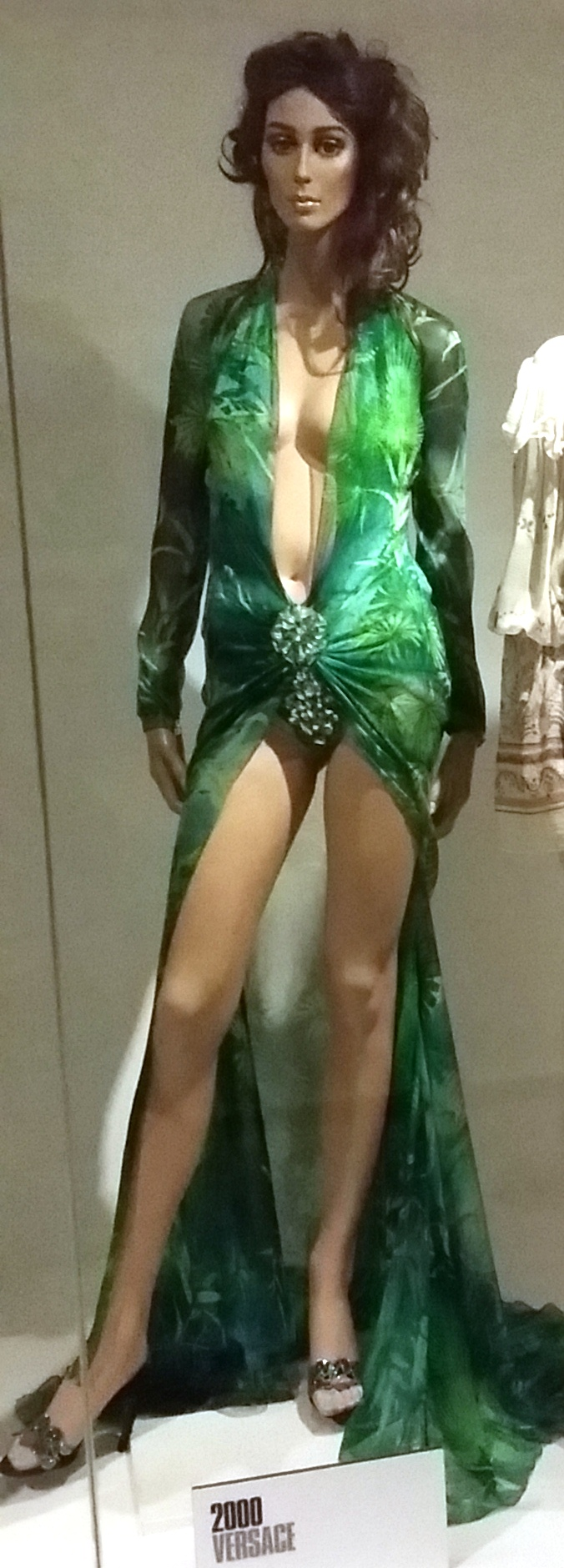
A silk chiffon dress identical to that worn by Jennifer Lopez to the 42nd Annual Grammys in 2000, this version exhibited at the Fashion Museum, Bath, as part of their Dress of the Year Collection.

In January 2015, Google's president Eric Schmidt cited the massive attention to the dress Jennifer Lopez wore to the 2000 Grammy Awards as the motivation for the creation of Google Images search. In 2000, Google Search results were limited to simple pages of text with links, but the developers worked on developing this further, realizing that an image search was required to answer "the most popular search query" they had seen to date: Jennifer Lopez's green dress. Designed by Donatella Versace, the dress has been described as "jungle green", "sea green" or "tropical" green, a green dress with touches of blue to give an exotic appearance. It is a see-through silk chiffon dress with a tropical leaf and bamboo pattern, with a citrine-studded crotch. The dress "had a low-cut neck that extended several inches below [the] navel, where it was loosely fastened with a sparkly brooch and then opened out again," exposing Lopez's midriff and then cut along the front of the legs like a bath robe. The dress then drooped behind her on the floor, open at the back.

In the 2010s, the global textile industry came under fire for unsustainable practices. The textile industry is shown to have a negative environmental impact at most stages in the production process.

Global trade of secondhand clothing shows promise for reducing landfill use, however international relations and challenges to textile recycling keep the market small compared to total clothing use. Over consumption and waste generation in global fashion culture has led brands and retailers worldwide to embrace textile recycling, which has become a key focus of worldwide sustainability efforts. Brands increasingly advertise products made from recycled materials in according with shifting consumer expectations. From 2010, investments in textile recycling companies have boomed to scale recycling solutions to the global demand, with Inditex backing textile-to-textile recycling company Circ in July 2022 or Goldman Sachs leading an investment in mechanically recycled cotton company Recover Textile Systems.

Advancements in textile treatment, coating, and dyes have unclear effects in human health, and textile contact dermatitis is increasing in prevalence among textile workers, and regular people.

Scholars have identified an increase in the rate at which western consumers purchase new clothing, as well as a decrease in the lifespan of clothing. Fast fashion has been suggested to contribute to increased levels of textile waste.

The worldwide market for textiles and apparel exports in 2013 according to United Nations Commodity Trade Statistics Database stood at $772 billion.

In 2016, the largest apparel exporting nations were China ($161 billion), Bangladesh ($28 billion), Vietnam ($25 billion), India ($18 billion), Hong Kong ($16 billion), Turkey ($15 billion) and Indonesia ($7 billion).

== See also ==
- Dress history
- History of fashion design
- History of hide materials
- History of silk
- History of Western fashion
- List of individual dresses
- Otzi's clothing and shoes
- Timeline of clothing and textiles technology

== Bibliography ==
- Boucher, François. 20,000 Years of Fashion: The history of costume and personal adornment. New York: Harry N. Abrams, 1987 ISBN 0-8109-1693-2
- Jenkins, D. T. (2003). The Cambridge history of western textiles. Cambridge, U.K.; New York: Cambridge University Press. ISBN 978-0-521-34107-3. OCLC 48475172.
- Payne, Blanche; Winakor, Geitel; Farrell-Beck Jane (1992) The History of Costume, from the Ancient Mesopotamia to the Twentieth Century, 2nd Edn, HarperCollins ISBN 0-06-047141-7
- Piponnier, Françoise, and Perrine Mane; Dress in the Middle Ages; Yale UP; 1997; ISBN 0-300-06906-5
