= Cave of the Warrior =

The Cave of the Warrior refers to cave no. 13 which was found in 1993 in a survey in the Wadi el Makkukh near ancient Jericho. The cave contained a burial of a man dating around 3800 BC. The dry desert climate preserved many organic materials. Especially important are several garments belonging to the largest and best preserved of this period, ever found outside of Egypt.

The cave contained the remains of a man, around 45 to 50 years old at the age of death. He was once about 162 (± 3) cm tall. Other finds include textiles, and a basket. a plaited mat and a twined mat, a wooden stick, arrows, a bow, a wooden bowls, sandals as well as stone tools. There were also found Hasmoenean coins (140 BCE to 37 BCE), evidently belonging to a much later period.

The garments are of special importance. The largest piece is made of linen and is 6.9 m long and 1.96 m wide. Its main function might have been to cover the dead body. Several parts are missing. The modern colour ranges from white to brown. The cloth was not dyed and the colour might be the result of the decomposing body and other natural causes. A rectangular cloth is about 1.4 to 0.88 m large. Its original function is unknown. It might be another cover for the dead body, but it might also have been a dress item. Another textile was labelled sash by the excavators. It was once about 1.98 cm long and 16 to 25 cm wide. The so-called bandage was found in several fragments and was 1.43 cm long and about 6.8 to 8.2 cm wide. Several smaller fragments of textiles were found too, but their function is unknown.

The date of the burial was received by C-14 dates.

== Bibliography ==
- Tamar Schick: The Cave of the Warrior: a Fourth Millennium Burial in the Judean Desert, Israel Antiquities Authority, Jerusalem, 1998, ISBN 965-406-035-3
