= Victoria Kakuktinniq =

Canadian Inuk fashion designer

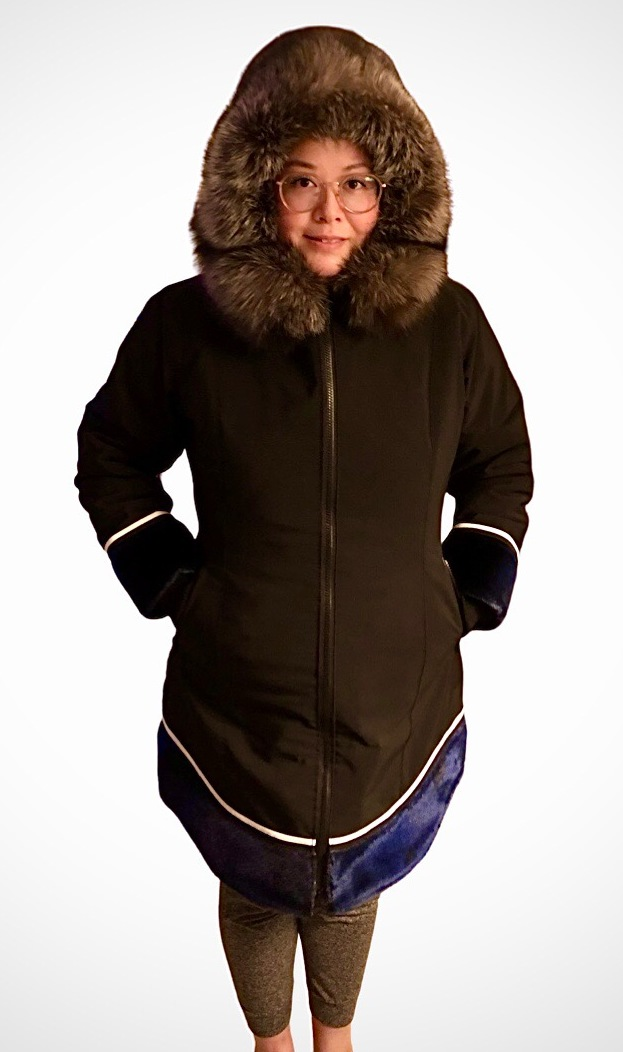
- Modern women's parka by Victoria Kakuktinniq, 2021. The body is synthetic waterproof fabric, with silver fox fur trim on the hood and sealskin trim on the hem and cuffs. The curved hem is typical of the traditional amauti.
- Born: 1989 (age 36–37); Rankin Inlet

Victoria Kakuktinniq (born 1989) is a Canadian Inuk fashion designer from Nunavut. Under her label Victoria's Arctic Fashion, Kakuktinniq hand-stitches clothing such as parkas, kamiit (winter boots), and other accessories. Her work has been described as a major influence in contemporary Inuit fashion. Kakuktinniq has described her work as a means of preserving Inuit traditional skills of sewing and clothing production, which has historically been a significant aspect of Inuit culture. In particular, she advocates for handmade fur garments as sustainable fashion.

Kakuktinniq works in a combination of modern and traditional materials, including leather, sealskin, and fox fur. Her parkas incorporate elements of traditional Inuit clothing, drawing in particular from the amauti, a woman's overcoat with a curved hem and voluminous hood. Modern elements include asymmetrical zippers, corset-style lacing, and colour-blocking.

Kakuktinniq, who is from Rankin Inlet, began designing parkas in 2012 after completing Miqqut, a cultural literacy program from Ilitaqsiniq (Nunavut Literacy Council), in which Inuit elders teach sewing skills to younger participants. She graduated from the fashion design program at MC College in Winnipeg, Manitoba in 2013 and began selling designs at trade shows and using social media. In 2015 her label was named Business of the Year at the Nunavut Trade Show & Conference. She opened her first shop in Iqaluit in 2017.

Kakuktinniq has showcased her designs at numerous fashion shows in Canada and abroad. Her first major show was What to Wear in the Winter at the Winnipeg Art Gallery (2015). She presented a Spring/Summer collection at International Indigenous Fashion Week, a feature event at Paris Fashion Week (2019). Kakuktinniq collaborated with other Inuit designers who provided jewellery, accessories, and footwear for her outfits. Later that year, Kakuktinniq co-produced Upingaksaaq Fashion Show in Iqaluit, which featured Inuit designers. In 2020, she presented a Fall/Winter collection at New York Fashion Week (NYFW). She was one of five artists chosen to design a pair of mukuks for the Manitobah Mukluks 2021 Artist Series.

In 2022, Kakuktinnniq partnered with winterwear brand Canada Goose on a capsule collection for the third iteration of Project Atigi, their collaboration line with national Inuit organization Inuit Tapiriit Kanatami. Kakuktinnniq had been invited to work on the original iteration, but declined to focus on her brick and mortar store in Iqaluit. The advertising campaign for the collection featured Inuit women as models: throat singer Shina Novalinga, actress Marika Sila and model Willow Allen. Parkas from this collection were displayed at Iqaluit Airport in July 2022 for an exhibit curated by the Culture and Heritage department of the Government of Nunavut.

Kakuktinniq presented at NYFW in February 2024, and at the inaugural SWAIA Native Fashion Week, organized by the Southwestern Association for Indian Arts, in May 2024. In August 2024, she returned to Rankin Inlet for her first show there since at least 2017.

== See also ==
- Nicole Camphaug, an Inuk designer who works with sealskin
- First Nations fashion
