= Nicole Camphaug =

Canadian Inuk fashion designer

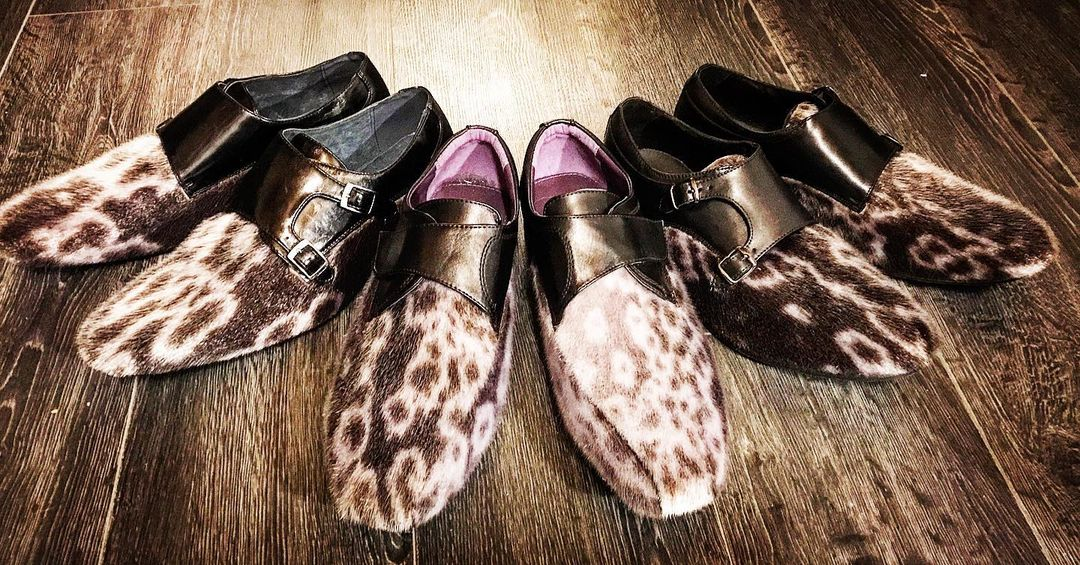
Men's dress shoes with undyed ringed seal skin, by Nicole Camphaug, 2021

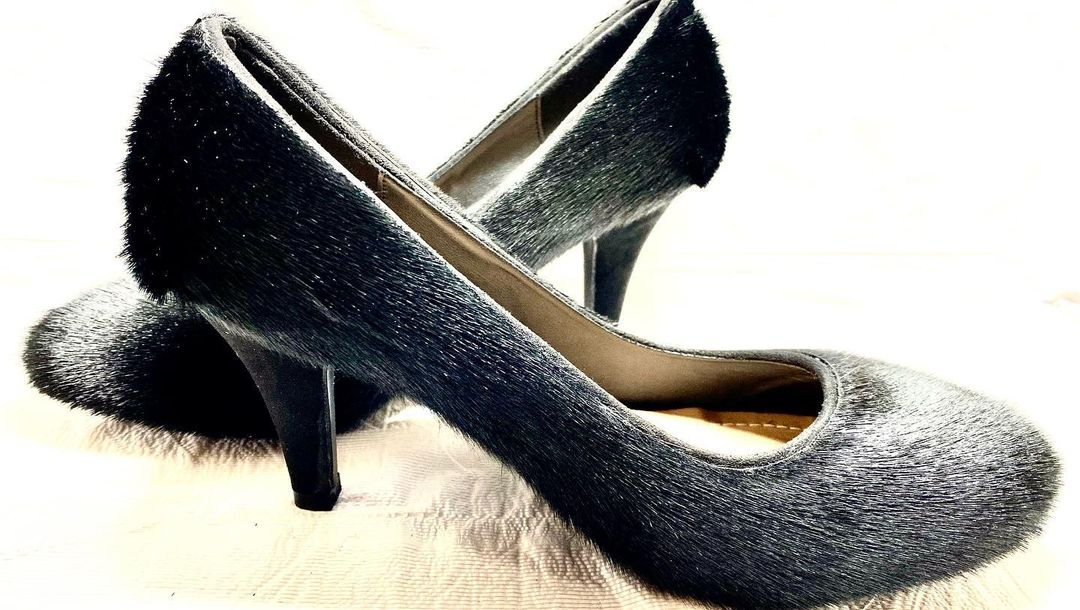
Women's high-heeled shoes with dyed black harp seal fur, by Nicole Camphaug, 2021

Nicole Camphaug is a Canadian Inuk fashion and jewellery designer from Nunavut. She is primarily known for creating sealskin-covered shoes and other contemporary Inuit fashion items under the label ENB Artisan, which she runs with her husband. Camphaug uses commercially purchased shoes and covers them with sealskin and ornaments made from traditional animal materials like caribou, muskox, and narwhal. The pelts are sourced from Labrador. She also makes jewellery from bone, tusk, and similar materials.

Camphaug, who is from Rankin Inlet, learned to sew at an early age, mostly producing traditional Inuit clothing items like parkas and hats for family and friends. In 2015, she created her first pair of shoes by attaching scrap sealskin to a pair of her old boots. When she posted photos of the boots to her Facebook page, the positive response encouraged her to make more, which she began to sell. Camphaug has described her work as a means of promoting sealskin products, as well as Inuit culture and fashion. In an interview with Up Here, she stated that she enjoyed making high heels and dress shoes in particular because it provides a way to wear sealskin outside the winter season without being too warm.

A pair of Camphaug's heels are held in the Bata Shoe Museum in Toronto. In 2016, a pair of high heels by Camphaug were featured in Floe Edge, an exhibition of Inuit art and design by Quebec art collective Axe Néo-7. In 2019, Camphaug provided accessories for outfits at the Upingaksaaq Fashion Show in Iqaluit, which featured Inuit designers. ENB Artisan was short-listed for the grand prize of the 2021 Pow Wow Pitch, a competition for Indigenous Canadian entrepreneurs.

== See also ==
- Victoria Kakuktinniq
- First Nations fashion
