= Floe Edge =

Art exhibition

Floe Edge: Contemporary Art and Collaborations from Nunavut was an exhibition of contemporary Inuit art and fashion staged by Quebec artist collective Axe Néo-7 and curated by Kathleen Nicholls of the Nunavut Arts and Crafts Association. The exhibition featured contemporary works from 18 artists in multiple media, including videos, drawings, and fashion. The organizers intentionally eschewed more traditional presentations of Inuit art such as soapstone carvings. Floe Edge originally appeared at the Galerie Axe Néo-7 in Gatineau, Quebec, from January to March 2016. The exhibition travelled to Canada House in London in September 2016. It was presented at the Urban Shaman Gallery in Winnipeg, Manitoba, from September to October 2017.

According to the artist statement, the exhibit was named for the "floe edge" phenomenon of the Arctic spring, when the frozen Arctic Ocean begins to melt along shorelines, creating a constantly-changing seascape filled with ice floes. The name serves as a metaphor for the lives and works of the artists involved, many of whom do not work solely as artists, and whose other jobs often influence their art.

Tanya Tagaq, an Inuk throat singer, performed a sung soundscape over a screening of the 1922 silent film Nanook of the North. Visual artist Ningiukulu Teevee contributed drawings. Landscape photographer Niore Iqalukjuak presented small-scale photographs of the Arctic. A team of video artists collaborated on a large-scale video presentation called Gauge, which used time-lapse photography to show a series of shapes on a wall of show. Sculptor Mona Netser presented Hunter with Kativak, a large-scale doll depicting a hunter with wild hair. The sculpture was staged so that the hunter's spear pointed at a drawing of a polar bear consuming a walrus, which Leah Snyder of Inuit Art Quarterly said formed "a dynamic arrangement of hunter and hunted."

Jewellery designer Mathew Nuqingaq showed a pair of snow goggles in sterling silver. Another jeweller, Lavinia Van Heuvelen, presented pieces in ivory. Contemporary sealskin fashion was represented in a lingerie set by Nala Peter and sealskin-covered high heels by Nicole Camphaug. Reviewers found the fashion a highlight of the show. Paul Gessell described the items as "totally impractical, drenched in kitsch and thoroughly delightful, thus possessing all the qualities of the over-the-top garments seen on the runways of Paris or Milan." He called the show "an upraised Inuit middle finger" to anti-sealing activists. Snyder described the presentation of these items as "a wry critique on Southern expectations of Arctic fashion".
