= Ningiukulu Teevee =

Canadian Inuk artist (born 1963)

- Born: Ningeokuluk Salomonie; May 27, 1963 (age 63); Cape Dorset, Nunavut, Canada
- Other name: Nigeokuluk
- Relatives: Jamasie Teevee (father-in-law)

Ningiukulu (Ningeokuluk) Teevee (born May 27, 1963 in Cape Dorset) is a Canadian Inuk writer and visual artist.

== Early and personal life ==
Formerly known as Ningeokuluk, as of March 2017 she uses the name, Ningiukulu, to reflect the modern orthography on her government issued identification. Teevee is the daughter of Joanasie (deceased) and Kanajuk Salomonie, and her father-in-law is the graphic artist Jamasie Teevee.

== Career ==
Ningiukulu Teevee is recognized as one of the Kinngait Co-operative's leading artists. Teevee is a self-taught artist, who began her career in the 1990s. She uses ink and coloured pencils as her primary mediums but is adept in a multitude of drawing media, including black fibre-tip pen, coloured pencil, oil sticks, and watercolour. Her subject matter is diverse and creative.

She is known for constructing imagery that is built from cognitive memory and knowledge of Inuit folklore, combined with the humorous aspects of contemporary life in Nunavut. The wealth of these Inuit stories depict, in her flattened 2D style (an abstraction of representation, referencing patterns found in nature), relationships between the land and animals that are used for sustenance, and the familial histories that define a wealth of cultural storytelling.

As a modern day Inuk, raised in an urban community, the artist explores contemporary themes but also retains an interest in her cultural heritage including the Inuit oral tradition. While her interpretation of the stories heard from Elders are true to the telling, they are nonetheless interpreted through her own imagination and presented from her personal perspective.

== Awards ==
Her first children's book, Alego, is an introduction to Inuit tradition and lifestyle, and was a nominee for the 2009 Governor General's Award for children's literature illustration. Alego is an autobiographical tale (written and illustrated by Teevee) about adventure and discovery along the seashore; for the first time, a young girl goes clam digging with her grandmother.

In 2023, Teevee won the Kenojuak Ashevak Memorial Award.

== Solo exhibitions ==
Teevee's work has been exhibited extensively across Canada and internationally. In 2006, her first solo art exhibition was held at the Feheley Fine Arts Gallery in Toronto, entitled, "Ningeokuluk Teevee." In 2009 she had her second solo exhibition at Feely Fine Arts Gallery in Toronto, entitled "Drawings by Ningeokuluk Teevee," which included a public presentation of Alego. In 2017, the Winnipeg Art Gallery opened Ningiukulu Teevee: Kinngait Stories at the Embassy of Canada in Washington, DC. In 2023, a show called Ningiukulu Teevee: Chronicles for the Curious" was held at the Art Gallery of Ontario. Ningiukulu Teevee: Stories from Kinngait curated by Darlene Wight was exhibited by The High Commission of Canada and the Winnipeg Art Gallery-Qaumajuq at Canada House, London, UK and will be exhibited at WAG-Qaumajuq in spring 2026.

Her artwork is featured in private collections and in the permanent institutional collections of the Art Gallery of Ontario, the National Gallery of Canada, the Canadian Museum of Civilization, the McMichael Canadian Art Collection, the University of Michigan Museum of Art, and the Winnipeg Art Gallery.

== Group exhibitions ==
- Canada 150 Project, Presented by Roche Bobois, Toronto (2017)
- Floe Edge: Contemporary Art and Collaborations from Nunavut, Canada House, London, UK (2016)
- Cape Dorset Annual Print Collection, Kinngait Studios, Cape Dorset (2004 –2016)
- 15 Years: Kinngait 2000 –2015, Feheley Fine Arts, Toronto (2015)
- New Voices from the New North, National Gallery of Canada (2014)
- Women in Charge: Inuit Contemporary Women Artists, Museo Nazionale Preistorica Etnografica, Rome, Italy (2012)
- New Art from Cape Dorset, Winnipeg Art Gallery (2011)
- Uuturautiit: Cape Dorset Celebrates 50 Years of Printmaking, National Gallery of Canada (2009)
- Arctic Spirit: 50th Anniversary of Cape Dorset’s Kinngait Studios, Art Gallery of Ontario, Toronto (2009)
