= Tobacco pouch =

Small bag for holding tobacco

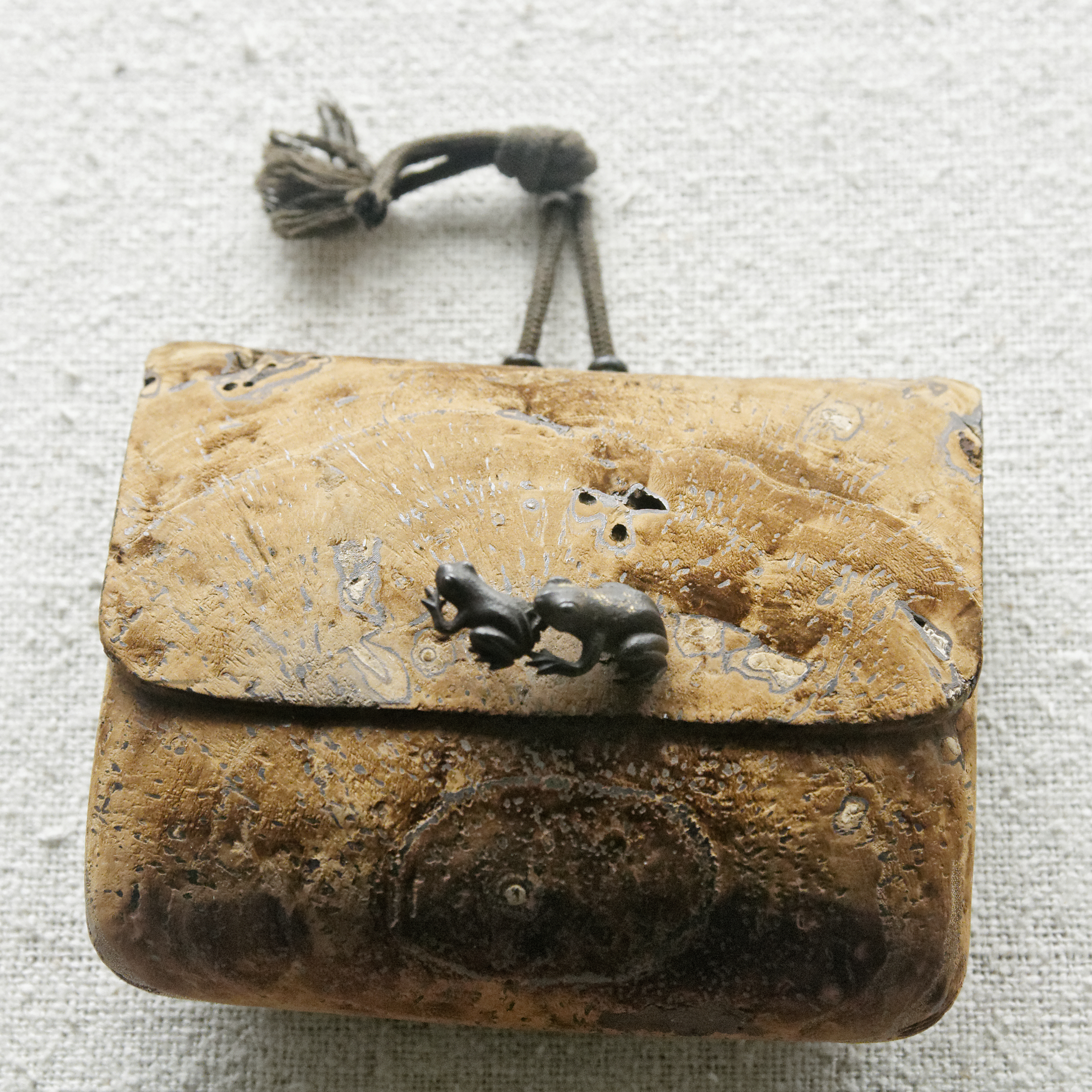
18th century tobacco pouch from Japan

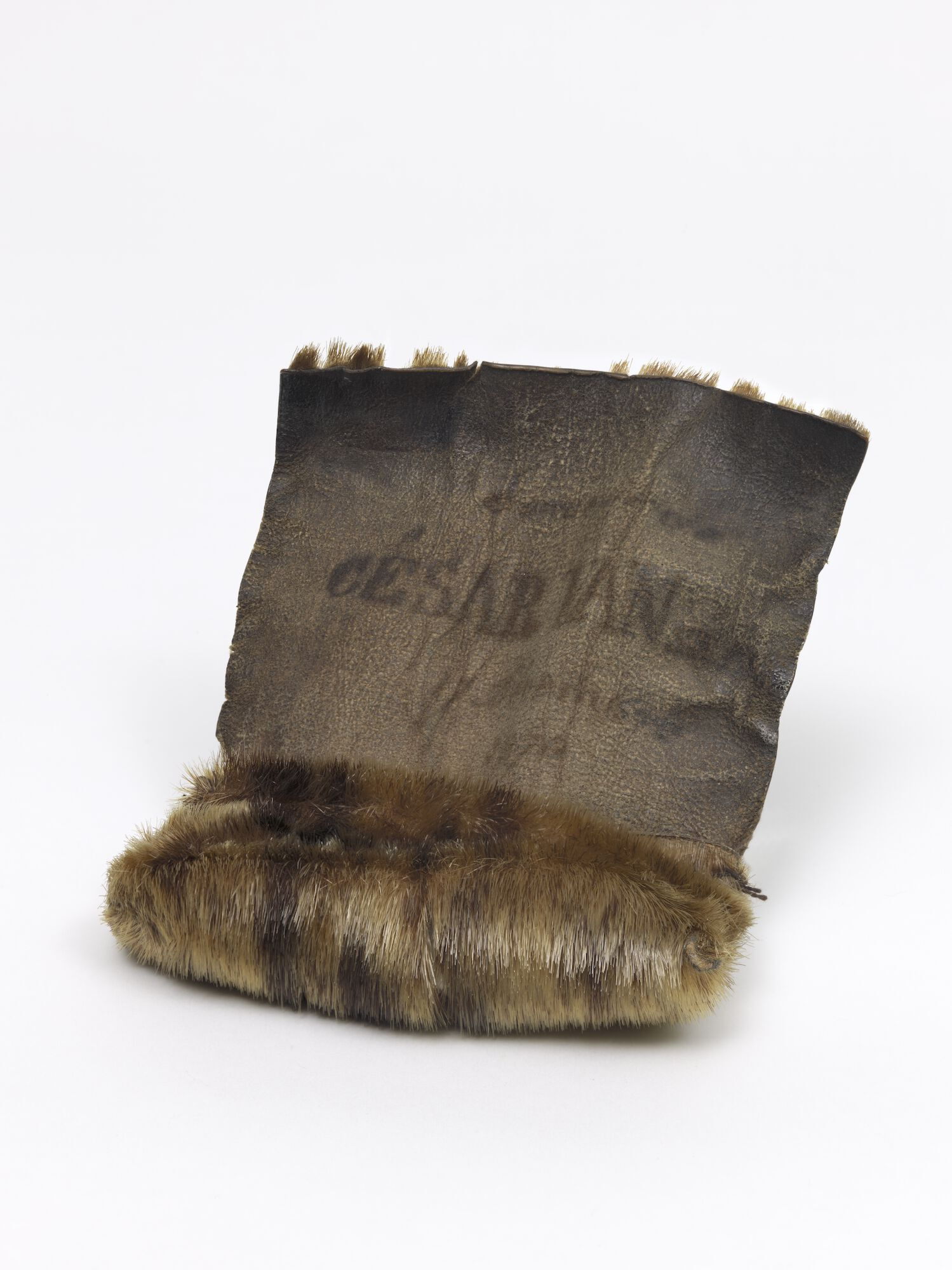
tobacco pouch from Belgium (circa 1870 - 1930)

A tobacco pouch is a pouch used to hold tobacco. They are often made out of leather, and once were made of sealskin. Rolling and pipe tobacco is often sold in a plastic pouch. The person who purchases the tobacco, if they own a tobacco pouch, will then transfer the tobacco from the plastic pouch to their leather one.

== History ==
Tobacco pouches date back to traditional Japan, and appear in artwork dating back to the 17th century. They were also made in Canada in the early 1900s. A tobacco pouch is a vital clue in the Sherlock Holmes short story The Adventure of Black Peter. Along with boots, tobacco pouches were one of the first uses of the zip.

Sir Walter Raleigh, an English explorer and one of the first to popularise tobacco smoking in England, kept a tobacco pouch during his final imprisonment with a Latin inscription: Comes meus fuit in illo miserrimo tempore ("It was my companion at that most miserable time").

== Use in crime ==
Commercial tobacco pouches have been produced in order to provide legitimacy to counterfeit tobacco. £8million of tobacco pouches were seized in Merseyside in 2012. Tobacco pouches, fake or genuine, have also been the target of burglaries in Bury St Edmunds in 2013. Tobacco pouches have also been used to store drug paraphernalia, including cannabis.

== Modern ==
In the modern world, tobacco pouches are made to hold all smoking accessories, not just tobacco. They are usually made out of real leather, which helps with keeping the tobacco fresh and ensuring that the pouch will last for a long time.
