= Port au Choix Archaeological Site =

Archaeological site in Canada

Port au Choix
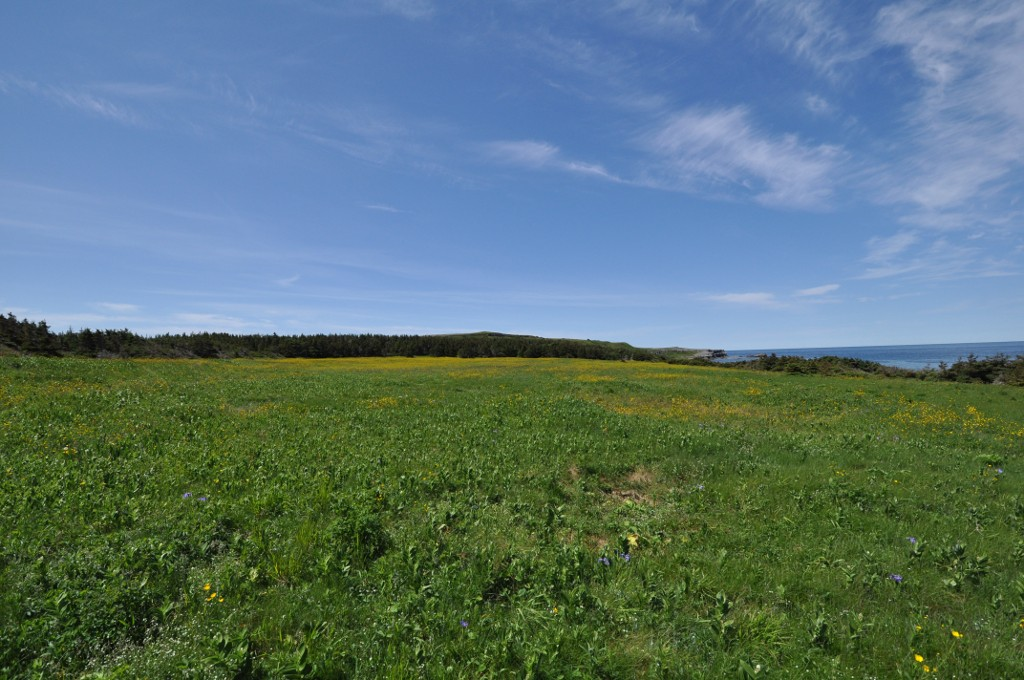
- Philip's Garden archaeological site

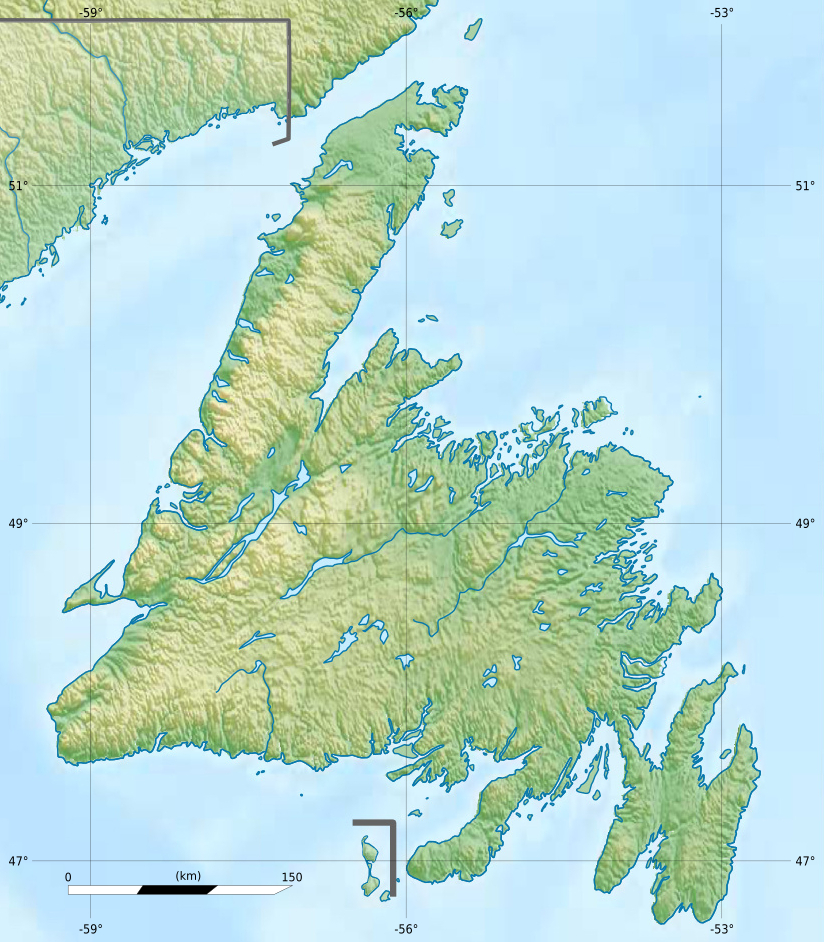
- Location within Canada Location within Newfoundland
- 50°41′49″N 57°22′54″W
- Location: Newfoundland and Labrador, Canada

Site notes
- Governing body: Parks Canada

National Historic Site of Canada

Port au Choix is a peninsula on the western coast of the island of Newfoundland, Canada. Discoveries as early as 1904 provide evidence that native peoples settled here, burials, structural remains, and artifacts such as points, tools, and bones of discarded food.

== Geography ==
Port au Choix is located on the northwestern coast of the island of Newfoundland, the farthest eastern border of Canada. It protrudes from the island as a peninsula with another peninsula extending northeast from that. This unique geography provides a large amount of coastline for a small area making it excellent as a port city.

== History ==
The island of Newfoundland has an abundance of resources for hunter-gatherer peoples. For thousands of years it was occupied by a variety of native people. Maritime Archaic Indians were the first people to occupy the island of Newfoundland. A Maritime Archaic Indian cemetery dates as far back as 4400 BP. was found in 1967 by James Tuck, of Memorial University of Newfoundland, who excavated 56 graves, determined to be between 4400 and 3300 years old. This discovery prompted Port au Choix to be designated a National Historic Site in 1970. No structural remains were found near the burial sites, leading archaeologists to assume the natives buried their dead far from their settlements. In fact, there are no Maritime Archaic Indian dwelling sites yet discovered on Newfoundland. Due to post-glacial sea level rise, there are potentially many Maritime Archaic Indian dwelling sites submerged in the ocean. Sea level has risen approximately thirteen feet in the last 4400 years since the Port au Choix burial site was first used.

In contrast, there have been many discoveries of Dorset Paleo-Eskimo dwellings on Newfoundland, which have been radiocarbon dated to between 1990 and 1180 years B.P.. After the Maritime Archaic Indians left the region, the Paleo-Eskimos began to expand their settlements further south into Newfoundland. The Dorset Paleo-Eskimo people relied heavily on maritime resources, especially seals, for subsistence. The Dorset people occupied Port au Choix for approximately seven hundred years, constructing many dwellings. At the site of Phillip's Garden, one of the richest archaeological sites on Port au Choix, there are 50 documented structural remains. It is thought these were wooden peaked roofed structures with hides over the top.

Today, these ruins are characterized by depressions in the ground as well as architectural elements of low walls, a central cooking area, and a platform to the rear of the house. Excavation of these remains became known as the Port au Choix Archaeological Project, which began in 1984 and continues today. It is believed that the Dorset Paleo-Eskimos abandoned Port au Choix due to global warming of that time period, approximately 1200 B.P. This was a result of changing temperatures pushing the harp seals away from Port au Choix. This was due to the changing food resources for harp seals. They were a crucial part of the Dorset diet. After the departure of the Dorset Paleo-Eskimos, a group of people known as the Recent Indians moved into Port au Choix. Little is known about this group. The Beothuk people had contact with European settlers as early as 1713. They became extinct as a population by 1829. That ended the nearly five thousand years of native inhabitation of Port au Choix.

== Phillip’s Garden ==
One significant site of Dorset Paleo-Eskimo remains are located on the Port au Choix peninsula in the region known as Phillip's Garden. This archaeological dig has been divided into three sites, Phillip's Garden, Phillip's Garden East, and Phillip's Garden West. The Phillip's Garden sites are regarded as the most important discoveries in the Port au Choix area since the remains of structures were preserved from rising sea levels. There have been discoveries of dwellings by Dorset Paleo-Eskimos dating back to approximately 2140 B.P. The first excavation of Phillip's Garden was William Wintemberg of the National Museum of Canada in 1929. At this time he discovered numerous sites of Newfoundland's Great North Peninsula, including Port au Choix. Phillip's Garden was the largest site found during the survey.

Phillip's Garden remained unexamined after its initial discovery by Wintemberg until 1949, when Elmer Harp Jr. began to excavate at Port au Choix and made many discoveries through the early 1960s. Harp, a distinguished archaeologist who specialized in the Arctic and Paleo-Eskimos, was the first to determine that some remains and artifacts discovered at Port au Choix were those of Paleo-Eskimos, not Indians.

== Artifacts ==
A variety of tools, pottery, and other artifacts have been discovered at Port au Choix. Along with human remains, artifacts were discovered in the burial sites. Tools such as woodworking implements were found in the graves. It is believed these were designed for building structures and watercraft. Phillip's Garden produced a wealth of ancient tools used by its former inhabitants. Along with 50 house dwelling sites, thousands of individual artifacts have been discovered by excavators in the last half century. Since both the Maritime Archaic Indians and Dorset Paleo-Eskimos were very dependent on the sea for sustenance, there is a lot of evidence showing evidence of seal hunting at this location. Archaeologists M.A.P. Renouf and Trevor Bell studied the hunting and harvesting of harp seals by the Dorset Paleo-Eskimos at Phillip's Garden. They concluded that the Dorset people utilized the animals fully. Their meat was used for food, their fat for fuel, and their skin for making clothes and boots by the Dorset people.

== Management ==
Port au Choix is a National Historic Site of Canada. The site is managed by a combination of native descendants, land owners, and Parks Canada staff as well as local community members.
