= Shina Novalinga =

Inuk social media personality

- Born: 1 July 1998 (age 28); Puvirnituq, Quebec, Canada
- Education: John Abbott College
- Occupations: social media personality; singer

Instagram information
- Page: Shina Nova
- Years active: November 2014; 11 years ago
- Followers: 2 million

TikTok information
- Page: Shina Nova
- Years active: April 14, 2020; 6 years ago
- Followers: 4.4 million

YouTube information
- Channel: Shina Nova
- Years active: March 23, 2021; 5 years ago
- Subscribers: 272 thousand
- Views: 175 million
- Last updated: November 2, 2025

Shina Novalinga (Inuktitut syllabics: ᓯ̵ᓇ ᓄᕙᓕᓐᒐ, born 1998) is an Inuk social media personality, singer, and activist. She gained fame for posting videos throat singing with her mother on TikTok and Instagram, who has been a professional throat singer for many years. Her love of throat singing came from her mother and wanted to express her culture to those unfamiliar with it, which is how she started to create videos on social media.

== Early life and education ==
Shina Novalinga was born July 1, 1998 to her mother Caroline (Kayuula) Novalinga, a professional throat singer, in Puvirnituq, Nunavik, Canada and moved to Montreal when she was four years old. She describes herself as half Inuk and half Quebecoise. Novalinga learned to speak Inuktitut with her mother, and began throat singing under her mother's instruction when she was seventeen. She has a younger sister named Catherine Lizotte.

In the spring of 2021, Novalinga graduated with a degree in business management from John Abbott College in Quebec. She started a one-year program in Inuit Studies at Nunavik Sivunitsavut in Montreal in fall 2021.

== Social media ==
=== TikTok ===
Novalinga gained fame in March 2020 after she began posting viral videos to TikTok under the handle @shinanova which feature aspects of her Inuit culture. As of July 2021, Novalinga's most viewed video portrays her mother brushing and braiding Novalinga's hair to the song "Savage Daughter" by Sarah Hester Ross, with 21.6 million views.

== Throat singing ==
Inuit throat singing is a cultural practice that became increasingly rare after Christian missionaries outlawed the songs as "Satanic" in the early 20th century. In Puvirnituq, Novalinga's mother Carolina Novalinga was one of four Inuit women who were taught the practice to pass on to younger generations. The history of the game is that it was played by Inuit women while they were bored in their igloos, as the men were out and about going on long hunting trips. To help pass through the long cold winters, this game was played as a way to express their culture with enjoyment.

In the traditional practice of Inuit throat singing, the game is played typically by two women that stand across from each other. They sometimes rock side to side and slightly bounce while they are singing. Between the two people, there is someone that leads by having a rhythmic pattern, while the other person has a response. This is what makes this an enjoyment and what makes the game so significant. Many times, this can last for many minutes because one of people might be low on breath or it generally might be because they are laughing by looking at each other. Almost like a tournament style, the person that won the round would face a new challenger and this would all keep happening until the group of women wanted to stop for the day. Shina emphasizes that her tribe welcomes anyone that is willing to come out and practice this skill. Each song performed carries its very own significance, such as mimicking the sound of animals and nature. It encompasses a variety of sounds that have different airflows to it. For example, some of the songs require control of airflow, while others are higher pitched.

Novalinga first posted herself throat singing in her first video posted to TikTok in March 2020, and has posted dozens of such videos since. Novalinga's throat singing videos feature her facing her mother Carolina in an embrace, singing in a matched rhythm using their throat, belly and diaphragm. They often end in the two breaking song and laughing, which is how the game is normally played. Novalinga has been vocal about the importance of throat singing both for her relationship with her mother and Inuit culture as a whole:

Throat singing is important in our culture because it had almost been a lost tradition due to missionaries. We are now taking it back and passing it down to keep it alive. Throat singing allows us to connect with the sound of nature and the animals. It also allows us to connect with our ancestors, our soul and our voice. The connection between my mother and I grows bigger as we throat sing together. It's always a beautiful moment for us.

In June 2021, Novalinga released an album with her mother and Canadian producer Simon Walls, Mother and Daughter Throatsinging.

== Fashion ==
Novalinga also uses her platform to model traditional Inuit clothing. She celebrates clothing handmade with local furs and animal skins by her mother Caroline, including atigik (parka), earrings, paaluk (mittens), nasaks (hats), and kamiks (boots). In 2021, Novalinga modeled for a Sephora ad campaign featuring all-indigenous cast and crew in celebration of Canada's National Indigenous History Month. In 2022, she was featured in Elle Canada modelling designs by Inuk designer Victoria Kakuktinniq.

== Indigenous activism ==
Novalinga has been outspoken about her desire to educate others about Inuit culture and history. She frequently adds "indigenous twists" to trends on TikTok as a way of sharing her culture, and has collaborated with Cree creators including hoop dancer James Jones and model Michelle Chubb. Novalinga has also created videos drawing attention to the oppressive history of assimilationist residential schools and to missing and murdered indigenous women. In summer 2021 she posted multiple videos reacting to the 2021 Canadian Indian residential schools gravesite discoveries.

Novalinga has used her platform to raise support for various charity causes as well, raising over $12,000 for an indigenous women's shelter in Quebec in December 2020.

== Discography ==
| Title | Details |
|---|---|
| Mother and Daughter Throatsinging | Released: June 14, 2021; Label: Self-released; Formats: CD, streaming, digital download |
