= Willow Allen =

Canadian model

- Born: 1998 or 1999 (age 27–28); Inuvik, Northwest Territories, Canada
- Occupations: model, content creator
- Spouse: Cale Kindrachuk (m. 2022)
- Children: 1

Willow Allen is a Canadian fashion model and TikToker, from Inuvik, Northwest Territories.

== Early life and education ==
An Inuvialuit, Allen was born and raised in Inuvik. She attended Briercrest Christian Academy for the last two years of high school, and went on to attend Briercrest College for one semester. While at Briercrest, Allen became a Christian.

She was studying social work at MacEwan University when she was discovered. As of 2022, she was hoping to complete her degree and go on to work with native communities after she graduates.

== Career ==
Allen was scouted to become a model on social media in 2019 and subsequently signed with Mode Models. She has worked with the likes of Canada Goose, the Canadian edition of Elle, and Christian Louboutin. Being on the cover of Elle Canada was "a major career milestone" that got her started on her modelling career. She has worked in Singapore and New York. While in Singapore, she did modelling work for such brands as New Balance, Highsnobiety, Sony, Levi Strauss & Co. and Prada.

Allen has also appeared in Canadian singer Tyler Shaw's music video for "When You're Home", which was filmed in Toronto.

In November 2023, Allen appeared in Vogue.

=== Online presence ===
Allen has a following on TikTok of over 690,000; she uses the platform to educate viewers about life in the Canadian Arctic and about her Inuit heritage. In 2022, she was included in a TikTok accelerator program for indigenous creators.

== Personal life ==
Allen and her husband, Cale Kindrachuk, eloped prior to October 2022, followed by a traditional ceremony in April 2023. The couple live in Saskatchewan.

In July 2023, Allen announced on TikTok that the couple were expecting their first child. Allen struggled with hyperemesis gravidarum during her pregnancy. Her son was born on 20 January 2024.

== Awards ==
In 2022, Allen won the Canadian Arts and Fashion Awards' Fresh Face of the Year Award.

Allen was one of eleven recipients of the 2023 Indspire Awards.
