= Amauti =

Parka worn by some Inuit women

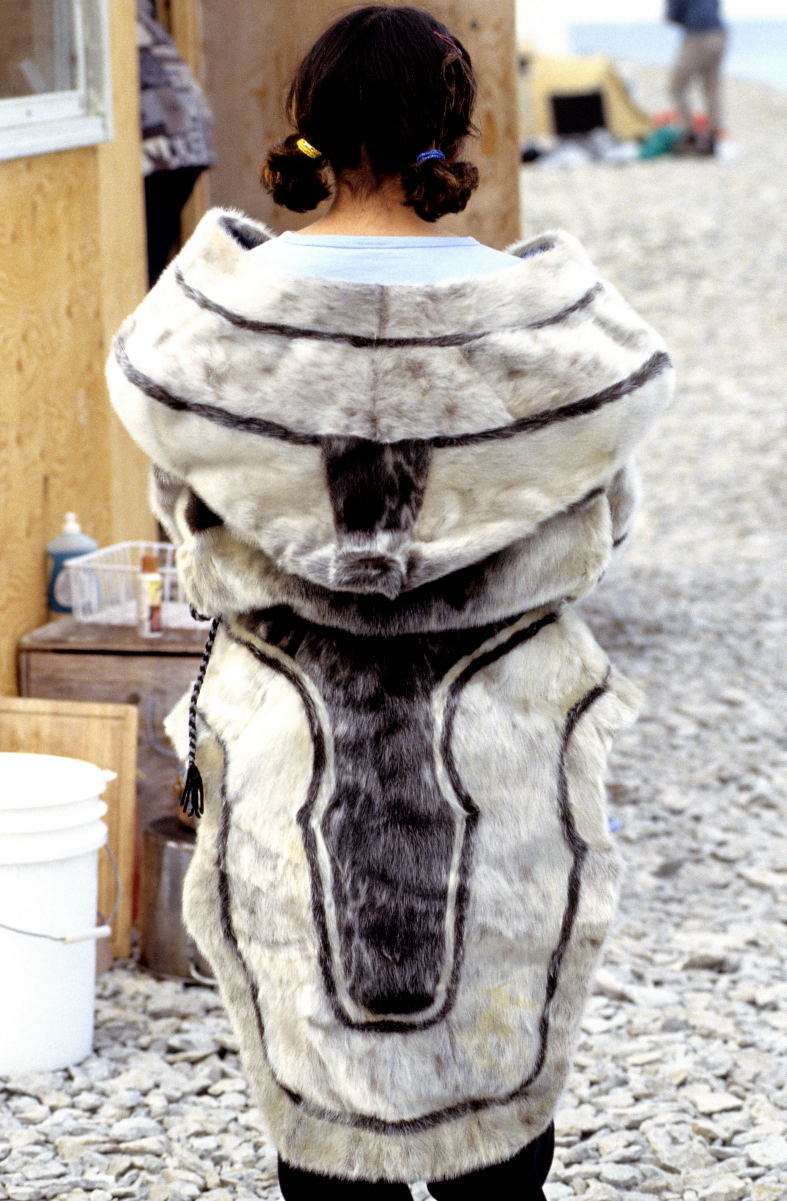
Rear of amauti, bearded seal fur.

An amauti (also amaut or amautik, plural amautiit) is a parka worn by Inuit women of the eastern area of Northern Canada. Up until about two years of age, the child nestles against the mother's back in the amaut, the built-in baby pouch just below the hood. The pouch is large and comfortable for the baby. The mother can bring the child from back to front for breastfeeding or for eliminatory functions without exposure to the elements. This traditional eastern Arctic Inuit parka, designed to keep the child warm and safe from frostbite, wind and cold, also helps to develop bonding between mother and child.

== Naming ==
language	long-tailed style amauti	skirted style amauti
Iñupiaq	not used	amaaġun ~ amaunnaq
Nattiliŋmiut	akulik	amauti
Inuinnaqtun	ᐊᑯᖅ akuq	ᐊᒪᐅᑎ amauti
Caribou Inuit	ᐊᑯᖅ akuq	ᐊᖏᔪᖅᑕᐅᔭᖅ angijuqtaujaq
North Baffin dialect	ᐊᑯᖅ akuq	ᐊᖏᔪᖅᑕᐅᔭᖅ angijuqtaujaq

== The making of the amauti ==
The amauti can be made from a variety of materials including sealskin, caribou skin or duffle cloth (a thick woollen cloth) with a windproof outer shell. Children continue to be commonly carried in this way in the eastern Arctic communities of Nunavut and Nunavik, but the garment is sometimes seen in the Northwest Territories, Greenland, Labrador, Russian Arctic and Alaska. Cloth amautiit have gradually displaced skin garments.

== The child's placement in the garment ==
Many external viewers think that the child is carried in the hood of the amauti, and this erroneous depiction can be seen in many works of art. This is not the case. The hood is enlarged in an amauti to permit both child and mother to be covered together, while the child is actually carried in the enlarged and extended back of the garment. The child rides with his or her belly against the mother's back and with knees bent. The garment is secured at the waist with a tie or belt which prevents the child from slipping down from the pouch. The weight of the child is carried across the shoulders of the garment although this weight is typically re-distributed by two more ties which form a "v" from the collar bone, with the base secured by the tie at the waist. A final tie attaches to the front edge of the hood, permitting the mother to either open the hood for a curious child to emerge and take in the surroundings, or to pull the hood across closing the child away from the wind and elements.

== Winter and summer clothing ==
There are usually two styles of amauti: skirted style akulik, like a dress (shown on the right, with the two women); and long-tailed style angijuqtaujaq, a longer back with a stylized tail-like hem at the back (shown on the left picture-white). Hood shape, decoration and tail shape all speak to the region of origin of an amauti. The sleeves and hem on a winter amauti are trimmed with solid colour stripes which emphasize the feminine/maternal cut, and the swing of the "tail". The winter amauti is classically seen with a white cotton cover (silapak), but also in other solid colours, with an inner duffle inner layer, also trimmed, in a darker solid colour.

In the past, the longer amauti tails were decorated with talismans such as beads, shells and pierced coins, although disapproval of these talismans as "heathen" by the church reduced the frequency within which they were used. The talismans were said to attract spirits to the swinging tail and thus protect the ovaries (and fertility), located at the front, from attracting spirit attentions.

Not shown are the more modern summer amauti which have no sleeves, less insulation, and permit a child to be carried while berry picking or in other summer occupations. They are also used during the winter months of the year, used with an oversized parka covering both mother and baby. The summer amauti is typically made from quilted cloth in any number of patterns.

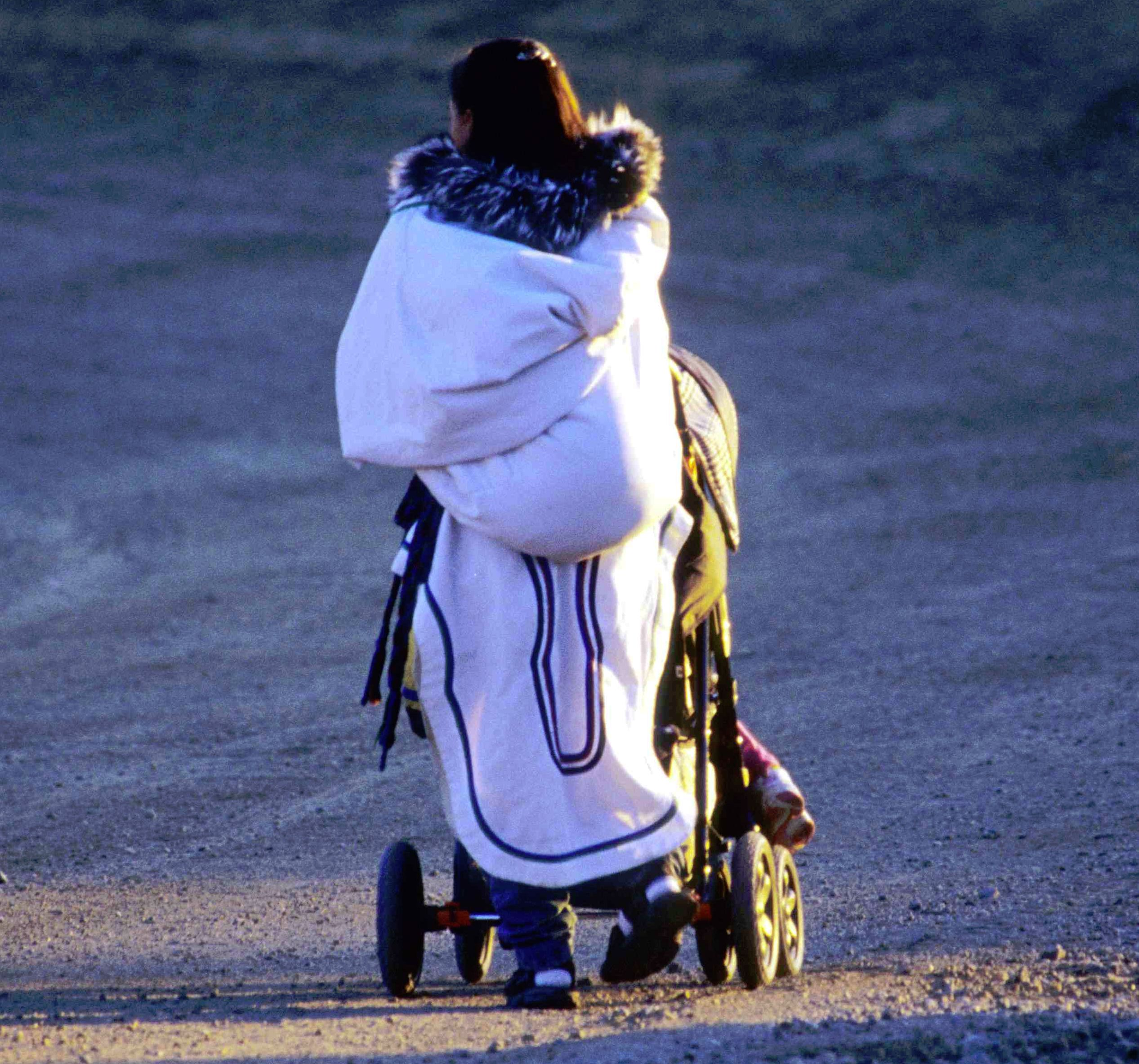
Inuk woman wearing an amautiq (long-tailed style, angijuqtaujaq) while pushing a baby carriage in 2002 in Kinngait, Nunavut.

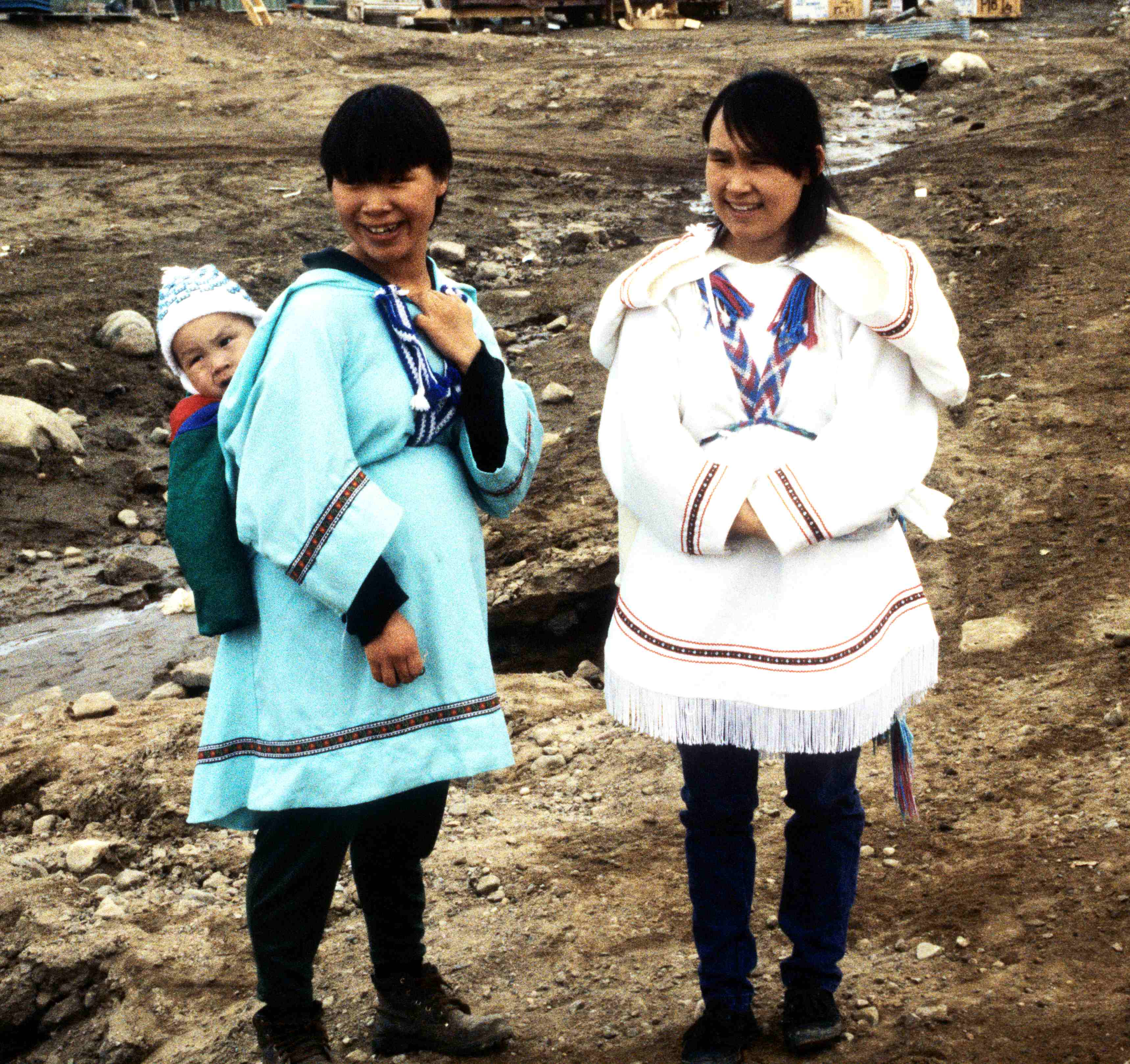
Two Inuit women wearing amautiit (skirted style, akuliq) in 1995 in Nunavut.

== Amauti as style ==
In 2007, an amauti beaded by Ooloosie Ashevak, the daughter-in-law of well-known Inuk artist Kenojuak Ashevak, sold at auction for $19,200 at Waddington's after being estimated at $4,000 to $6,000.
