= Sealskin =

Skin of a seal

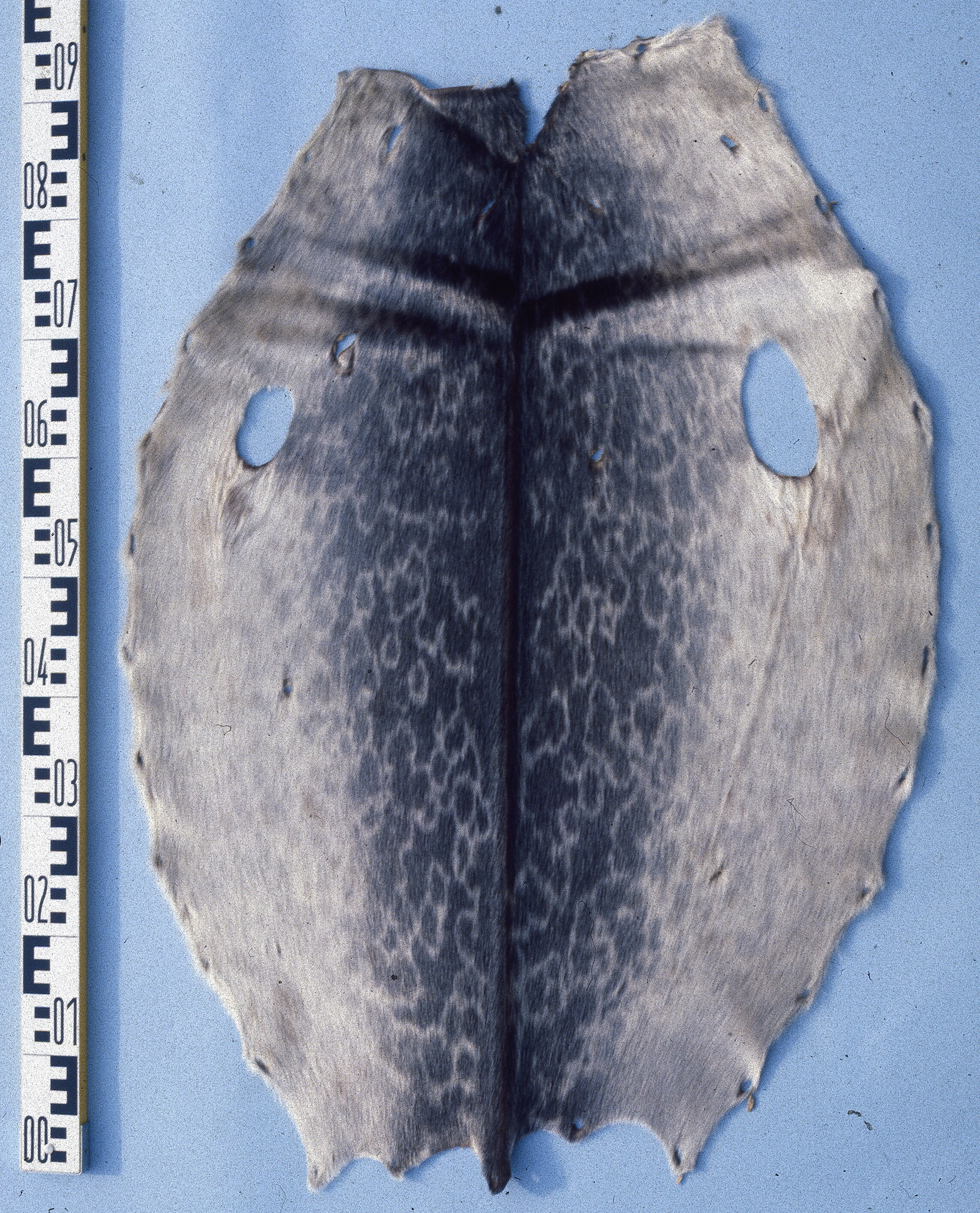
Ringed seal skin

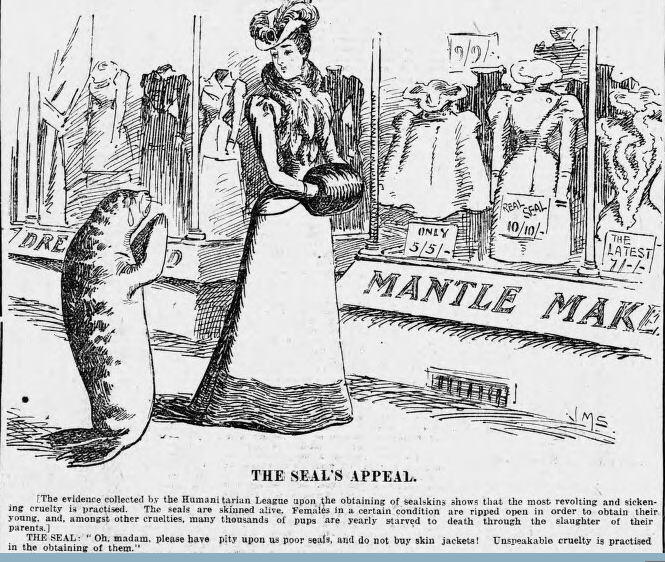
1899 anti-sealskin cartoon by J. M. Staniforth

Sealskin is the skin of a seal.

Seal skins have been used by the peoples of North America and northern Eurasia for millennia to make waterproof jackets and boots, and seal fur to make fur coats. Sailors used to have tobacco pouches made from sealskin. Canada, Greenland, Norway, Russia and Namibia all export sealskin. It was traditionally used to make Scottish sporrans.

The Inuit, a people indigenous to North America and Greenland, argue that banning both seal products and seal hunting is detrimental to their way of life and the Inuit culture. Further, films such as Angry Inuk (2016) expose the importance of sealing in providing a sustainable way of making money for Inuit that does not require destructive practices such as mining or seismic testing to take place. However, many non-Inuit object to the use of seal skin, fur and pelts, and it is illegal to hunt seals in many countries, particularly young seals. The value of global sealskin exports in 2006 was over CA$16 million.

Pinseal is the term for sealskin leather.
