= Harry Lindley Walters =

Canadian politician from Ontario

Member of the Ontario Provincial Parliament for Bracondale
- In office June 7, 1948 – October 6, 1951
- Preceded by: Harry Hyland Hyndman
- Succeeded by: Arthur George Frost

Personal details
- Party: Co-operative Commonwealth

Harry Lindley Walters was a Canadian politician who was Co-operative Commonwealth MPP for Bracondale from 1948 to 1951.

== See also ==
- 23rd Parliament of Ontario
