= Research on Inuit clothing =

History of research on Inuit clothing

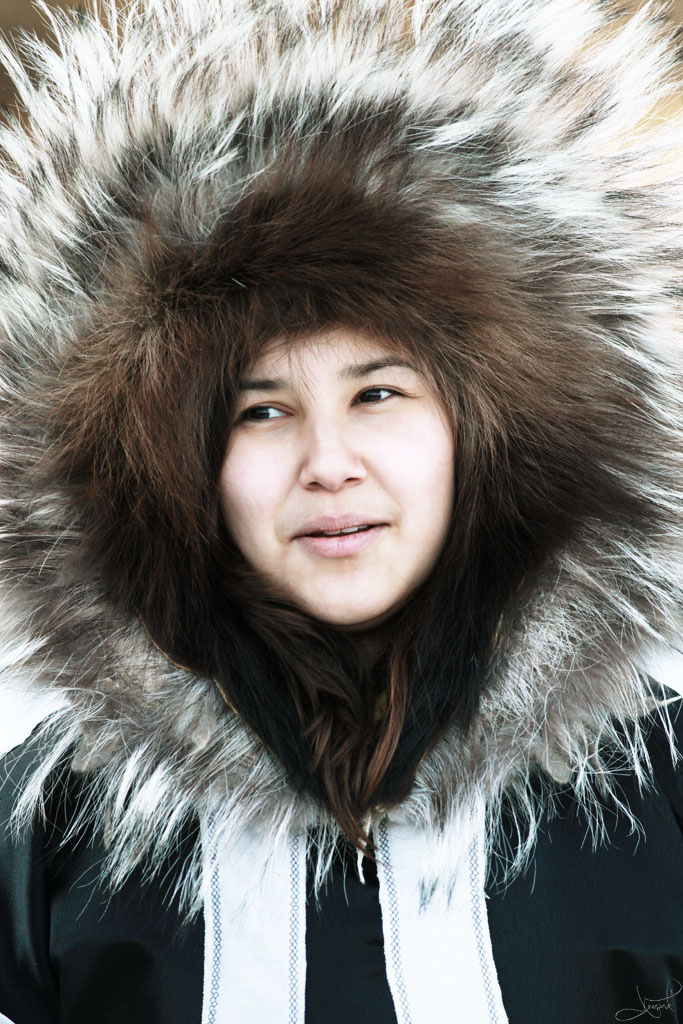
Inuk woman wearing parka with traditional large ruff of irregular fur; research has demonstrated the effectiveness of this style in preventing heat transfer from the face.

There is a long historical tradition of research on Inuit clothing across many fields. Since Europeans first made contact with the Inuit in the 16th century, documentation and research on Inuit clothing has included artistic depictions, academic writing, studies of effectiveness, and museum collections. Historically, European images of Inuit were sourced from the clothing worn by Inuit who travelled to Europe (whether voluntarily or as captives), clothing brought to museums by explorers, and from written accounts of travels to the Arctic.

From the 18th century until the mid-20th century, explorers, missionaries, and academic researchers described the Inuit clothing system in numerous memoirs and dissertations. After a decline in the 1940s, serious scholarship of Inuit clothing did not pick up again until the 1980s, at which time the focus shifted to in-depth studies of the clothing of specific Inuit and Arctic groups, as well as academic collaborations with Inuit and their communities. Scientific analysis of Inuit garments have often focused on the effectiveness of Inuit skin clothing as cold-weather clothing. Many museums, particularly in Canada, Denmark, the United Kingdom, and the United States, have extensive collections of historical Inuit garments, often acquired during Arctic explorations undertaken in the 19th and early 20th centuries.

== Painting, printing, and photography ==
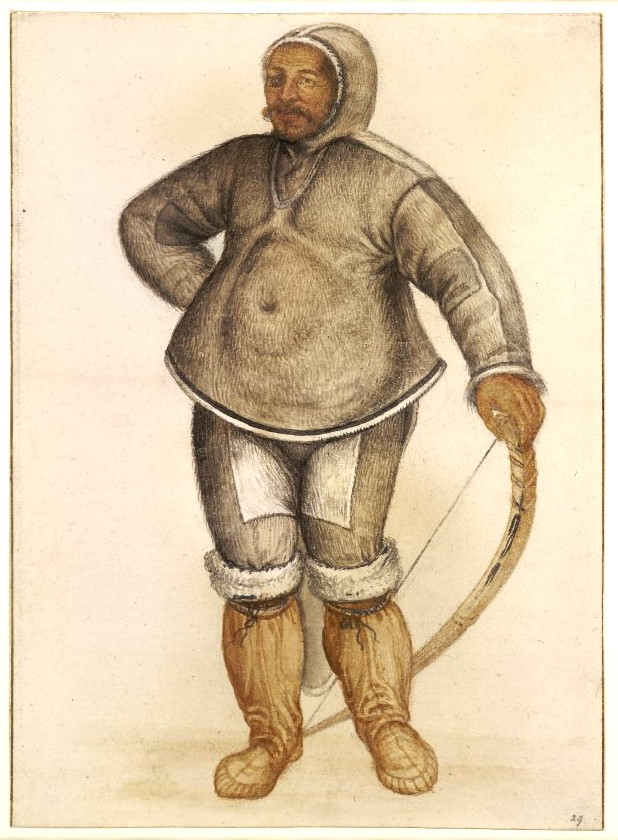
Inuk man known as Kalicho, painted by John White c. 1577

Inuit skin clothing has long been of interest to artists and academics of all kinds. Europeans interested in the Inuit and their culture began to create artistic depictions of Inuit clothing as early as the 16th century. These images were typically sourced from the clothing worn by Inuit who travelled to Europe (whether voluntarily or as captives), clothing brought to museums by explorers, and from written accounts of travels to the Arctic. The earliest of these was a series of illustrated broadsides printed after an Inuk mother and child from Labrador were brought to the European Low Countries in 1566. In 1577, the privateer Martin Frobisher brought three Inuit – Kalicho, Arnaq and Nutaaq – to England as captives, and the painter John White produced detailed watercolor portraits of them. A 1654 painting by Salomon von Hauen, commissioned at Bergen, Norway, is the oldest known portrait depicting the traditional clothing of the Kalaallit people of Greenland. It depicts a group of four Kalaallit who were kidnapped by a Danish trade ship, each wearing traditional skin clothing. Numerous other paintings and engravings of Inuit and their clothing were created in Europe over the following centuries.

When modern techniques such as lithography and photography became available in the mid-19th century, it allowed for an even wider dissemination of images of Inuit clothing, especially in illustrated magazines. Around 1860, a series of Danish publications about Inuit culture and clothing from Greenland included lithographs created by Inuit artists. Both the Canadian Arctic Expedition (1913–1916), and the Fifth Thule Expedition (1922–1924) brought cameras and photographers to the Arctic, recording numerous photographs of Inuit and their clothing. These groups did their best to integrate with the Inuit in a respectful way, but not every photographer of that time had a similar attitude. Many photographs of Inuit from the early 20th century do not identify their subjects by name, and many Inuit in those photographs appear visibly uncomfortable having their photograph taken.

== Academic writing and studies ==
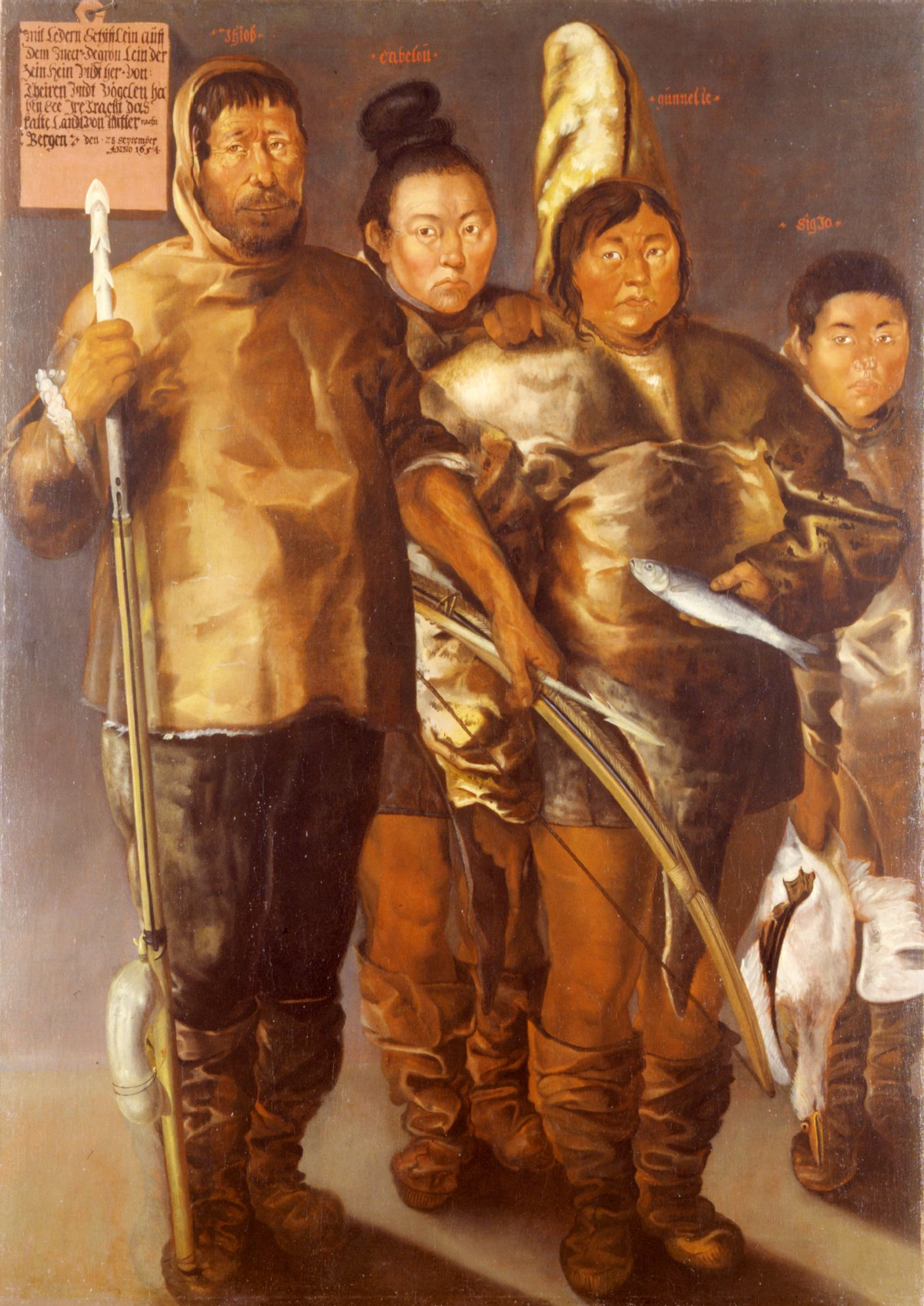
Four Kalaallit people in traditional skin clothing. Painted in Norway, 1654, after the subjects were kidnapped from Greenland by a Danish trade ship.

One of the oldest major works describing Inuit clothing in detail is the 1741 book Det gamle Grønlands nye Perlustration eller Naturel-Historie ("The Old Greenland's New Perlustration or Natural History") by Danish missionary Hans Egede. The book contained detailed drawings and descriptions of women's clothing from observations made during his fifteen years living in Greenland. Starting in the 18th century, the diaries and other writings of Arctic explorers and traders, and to a lesser extent, academics, provided further detail about daily Inuit clothing. As contact between outsiders and Inuit increased, so did the level of detail in their writing. The clothing of the Caribou Inuit and Copper Inuit during this time is particularly well-documented in such writing.

Anthropological study of Inuit culture and clothing by Danish, American, and Canadian scholars was common in the 19th and early 20th centuries. These sources focused on the physical aspects of Inuit clothing that enabled survival in the extreme Arctic environment, as well as the technical aspects involved in garment production. Ethnographers such as John Murdoch published descriptions of Inuit clothing with detailed illustrations as early as 1892, based on fieldwork in northwest Alaska. Canadian explorers Diamond Jenness and Vilhjalmur Stefansson lived with the Inuit during the Canadian Arctic Expedition, 1913–1916, adopting Inuit clothing and making in-depth studies of its construction. Jenness also accumulated a number of garments for the Canadian Museum of Civilization.

Danish archaeologist Gudmund Hatt wrote a dissertation on his theory of Inuit origins, published in 1914, which was based on his in-depth study of Inuit clothing in museums across Europe. Later scholarship disputed his migration theory, but his studies of Inuit clothing, with their elaborate images drawn by his wife Emilie Demant Hatt, have been described as "groundbreaking in their meticulousness and scope". By approximately 1940, serious scholarship of Arctic clothing had tapered off.

Scholarship of Inuit clothing did not pick up again until the 1980s and 1990s, beginning with fieldwork conducted by Inuit clothing expert Bernadette Driscoll-Engelstad, and supported by accounts created by northern seamstresses. By then, the style of grand cross-cultural study pioneered by Hatt had fallen out of the mainstream, with modern scholars preferring to make in-depth studies of the clothing of specific Inuit and Arctic groups. From the 1970s to 1990s, University of Manitoba researchers Jill E. Oakes and Rick Riewe travelled throughout the Arctic documenting the traditional footwear of circumpolar peoples.

Around this time, academic collaborations with Inuit and their communities became a dominant form of scholarship on the topic; these collaborations have been important for the preservation of traditional knowledge. For example, the Igloolik Research Centre in Nunavut, Canada, archives interviews with Inuit elders to preserve their traditional knowledge, including information about traditional clothing production techniques. In the 1980s, Driscoll-Engelstad travelled to museums in Europe and Canada with Inuit seamstresses to study historical garments. Their work has been credited with having "triggered a renaissance in clothing manufacture in some Canadian communities." Around the same time, Arctic anthropologist Susan Kaplan began to work with North Greenland Inuit and Labrador Inuit at the Peary–MacMillan Arctic Museum on similar fieldwork. In 1992, Inuit seamstresses travelled to the Canadian Museum of Civilisation to study the composition of Copper Inuit garments held there. The documentary film Piqutingit: What Belongs to lnuit, released in 2006, documents the journey of a group of Inuit elders to museums in Toronto, Ottawa, New York, Philadelphia, and Washington, where they studied Inuit items including clothing.

Increased access to travel and digital communication technologies like the internet have made it easier for museum curators to collaborate with Inuit communities. This can take the form of providing material to the community for cultural heritage programs, or arranging training so community members can make recordings of knowledge from the oral tradition. Many museums have created digital exhibits to provide greater access to their collections. Collaborative projects such as Skin Clothing Online, from the National Museum of Denmark, Greenland National Museum, and Museum of Cultural History, Oslo, have made thousands of high-resolution images and dozens of 3D scans of hundreds of pieces of skin clothing from various Arctic cultures freely accessible to researchers and the general public. Beginning in 2023, a group of Inuit artists and seamstresses called Agguaq began working with museums in order to study ancient garments with an eye to reviving and modernizing the designs.

== Modern scientific research ==
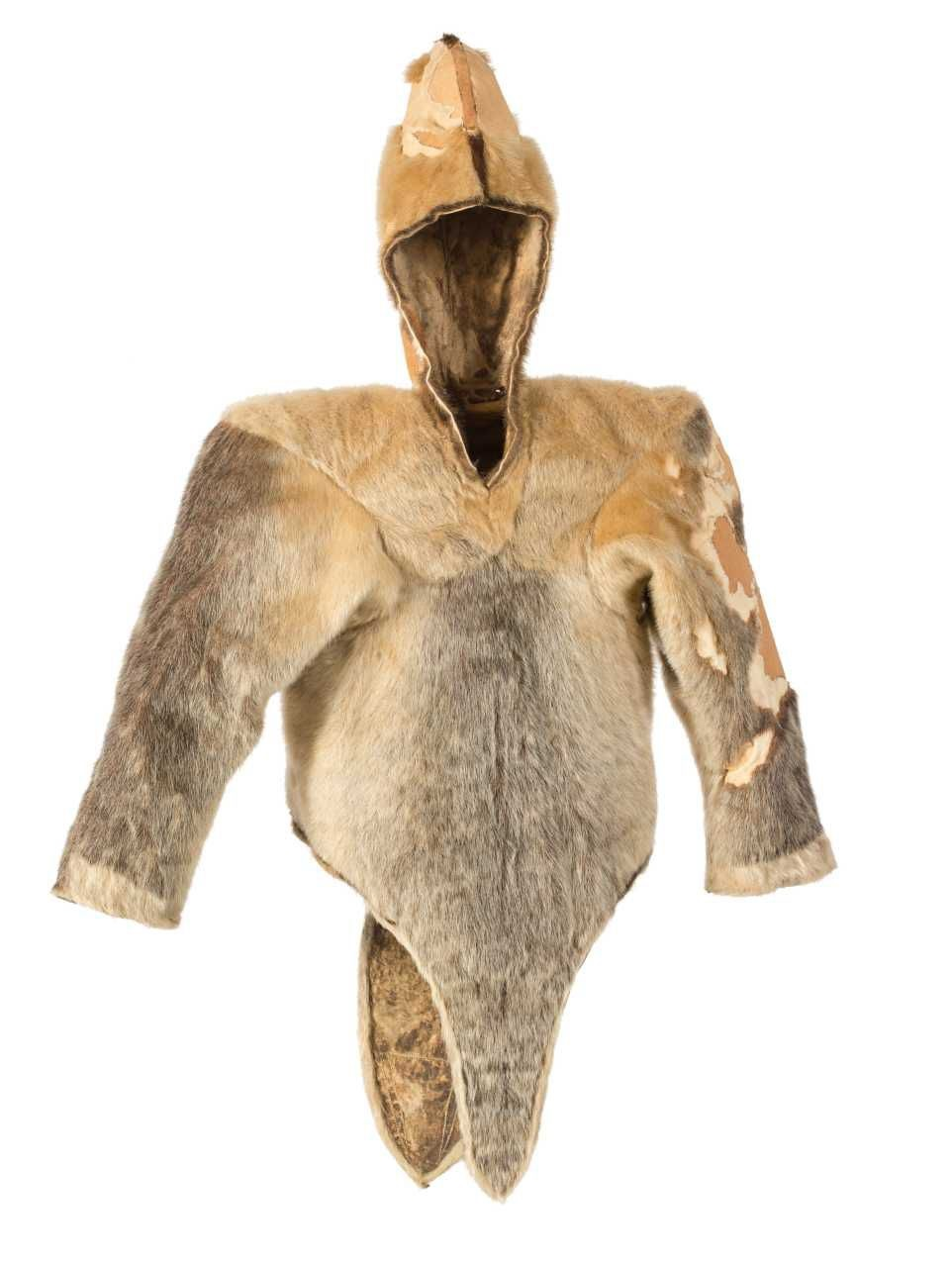
Sealskin woman's parka discovered at Qilakitsoq in 1972, dated to c. 1475

=== Archaeology ===
Archaeology is a major source of knowledge about the history of Inuit clothing, primarily in the form of artifacts such as tools for skin preparation and sewing, as well as art objects. More rarely, scraps of frozen skin garments or even whole garments are found at archaeological sites. Some of these items come from the earlier Dorset culture era, but the majority are from the Thule culture era of approximately 1000 to 1600 CE. Research on historical garments shows evidence for the historical consistency of Inuit skin clothing.

One of the most notable archaeological finds related to skin clothing was the 1972 discovery of a group of eight well-preserved and fully dressed mummies at Qilakitsoq, an archaeological site on Nuussuaq Peninsula, Greenland. The outer garments were made from sealskin, and the inner parkas constructed from the skins of at least five different types of water birds. The mummies have been carbon-dated to c. 1475, and analysis indicates that the skin garments they were found in were prepared and sewn in the same manner as modern skin clothing from the Kalaallit people of the region. Anatomical analysis of the mummies' teeth and biochemical analysis of the sealskin garments indicated that preparation methods have changed little over the past 500 years, including the use of teeth to soften skin for sewing.

Archaeological digs in Utqiaġvik, Alaska from 1981 to 1983 uncovered the earliest known samples of caribou and polar bear skin clothing of the Kakligmiut people, carbon-dated to c. 1510. The construction of these garments indicates that Kakligmiut garments underwent little change between approximately 1500–1850.

=== Analysis of garments ===
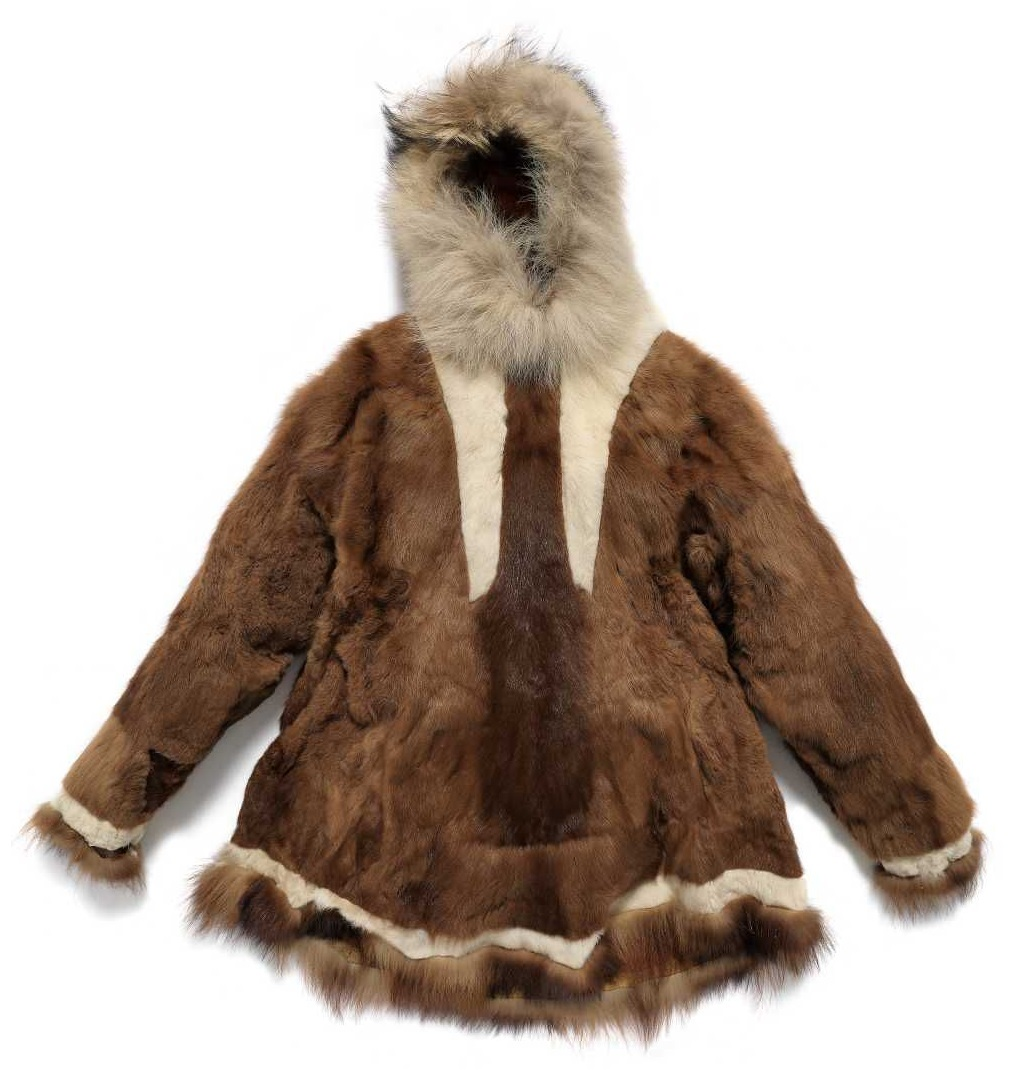
Reindeer hide parka with dog fur trim around the face, Alaskan Iñupiaq

Despite extensive oral testimony on the effectiveness of skin garments from Inuit elders, as well as written records produced by Arctic explorers as early as the 18th century, little research was performed on Inuit clothing until the 1990s. (Note: In the 1950s, some research was performed on the insulating properties of patches of caribou skin, with an eye towards developing high-performance winter clothing. These studies did not examine full traditionally-made skin garments, nor were they focused on traditional Inuit techniques.) Since then, several studies have investigated the effectiveness of Inuit skin clothing as protection against the weather, especially as compared to modern winter clothing made from synthetic materials. A study published in 1995 compared caribou-skin clothing to mass-produced military and expedition gear, and found that the Inuit garments were significantly warmer, and provided a greater degree of perceived comfort than the mass-produced items. Further studies have shown that the traditional Inuit hood, with its distinctive ruff of irregular fur, is the most efficient system for preventing heat transfer from the face in the cold, windy environment of the Arctic. A 2020 study used infrared thermal imaging to compare rates of heat loss between Inuit caribou-skin garments and two styles of mass-produced winter clothing. Under laboratory conditions, the Inuit outfit was found to be "similar to or slightly superior" to modern winter gear designed for extreme cold.

Scanning electron microscopy shows that the unique microscopic structure of caribou and seal hairs contribute to their effectiveness. Caribou hairs have a round cross-section, with an irregular surface and an internal structure "reminiscent of 'bubble-wrap'", which handily traps warm air inside each hair as well as between adjacent hairs. The keratin walls between cells are thin but tough, making individual hairs lightweight but resilient to damage. In contrast, seal hairs have a flattened cross-section and are solid throughout. The scales on the outside of each hair overlap only in one direction, resulting in a smooth surface. As a result, seal hair is less insulating than caribou hair, but is excellent at repelling water.

Scientific analysis can reveal other details about individual garments and the animal pelts they are made of. DNA analysis and protein sequence analysis via mass spectrometer can narrow down or confirm the genus or species of the animal that contributed a given piece of fur. Using these methods, analysis of early 20th century garments made from dog and wolf fur has been used to research the relationship between dogs and humans, indicating details of historical canine diets and genetic distribution.

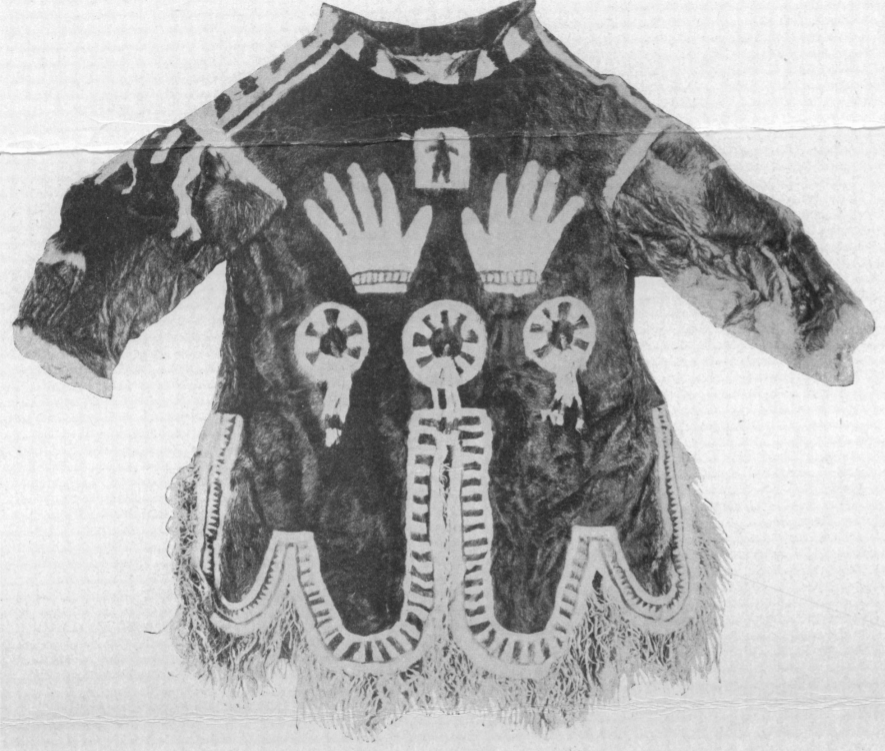
Front side of a garment known as the Shaman's Parka, c. 1900. The elaborately designed coat has been studied extensively. Original held at the American Museum of Natural History.

Historically, researchers and museum conservators who wished to create accurate drawings or sewing patterns for clothing, including Inuit skin garments, would draw them by hand or commission artists to do so. The highly involved process of measuring and tracing garments has drawbacks: the handling can cause additional damage and the process is time-consuming. Without dismantling the items, the results can be inaccurate. Accurately drawing garments at 1:1 scale is less damaging, but even more time-consuming.

Newer techniques have been developed to allow for accurate analysis of garment construction in shorter timeframes without having to dismantle garments. X-rays may be used to non-invasively identify sewing techniques. In 2006, the National Museum of Denmark and the Centre for Textile Research at the University of Copenhagen developed a method which combined the use of high-definition digital photography and photo editing software to create accurate, detailed scale images. Compared to hand drawing, this process is quicker and easier to perform, minimizes handling of the item, and provides similar levels of accuracy. Coordinate-measuring machines may be used to measure garments in three dimensions with minimal handling, enabling the creation of 3D models from which accurate two-dimensional sewing patterns can be created. This process takes an average of two hours per garment, and significantly reduces handling of the fragile original garment. The technique is considered applicable to other historical skins and garments.

=== Sociological studies ===
A 2020 report published by Indigenous Services Canada examined the cultural and sociological benefits of sewing clothing in modern Inuit communities. Based on interviews with 30 Inuit women from Ulukhaktok, Northwest Territories, the report concluded that participating in traditional sewing activities had positive effects for seamstresses, including socialization, cultural identification, and increased income.

Research published in 2021 indicated that group sewing sessions formed a useful basis for art-based research among Inuit women. Among other positive traits, the use of sewing as a culturally embedded activity was found to enable a greater balance of power between the participants, who were positioned as experts, and the researchers, who were not experienced seamstresses. This in turn allowed the participants to be more comfortable sharing information with the researchers.

== Museum collections ==
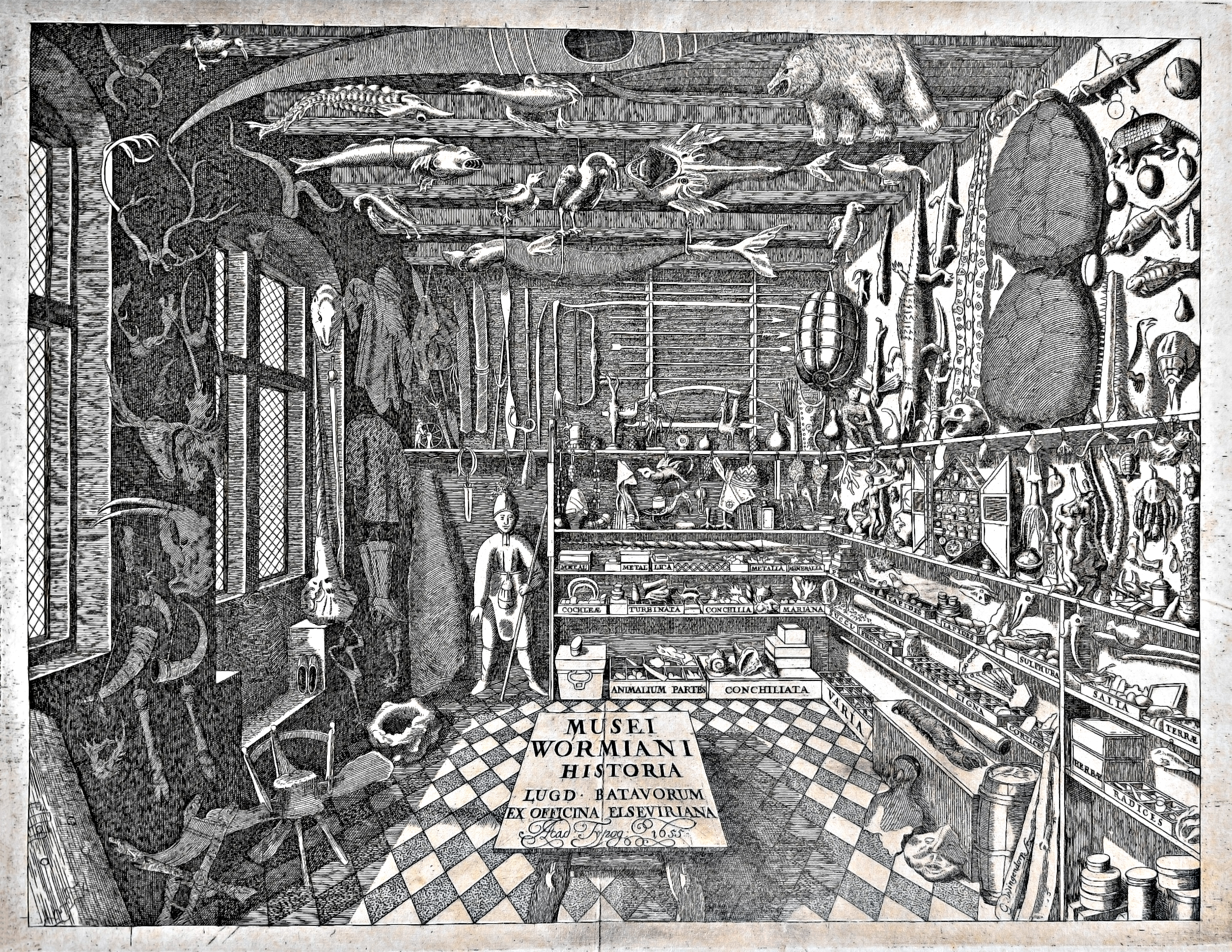
Frontispiece of the published inventory of the Museum Wormianum, 1642. Bird-skin and gut-skin coats are hung on the wall to the right of the window; sealskin coat on standing mannequin.

=== Collections ===
Many museums, particularly in Canada, Denmark, the United Kingdom, and the United States, have extensive collections of historical Inuit garments. The ceremonial dance clothing of the Copper Inuit is particularly well-represented in museums worldwide. The British Museum in London holds some of the oldest surviving Inuit fur clothing, collected by Captain William Edward Parry at Igloolik in the early 1820s. The Smithsonian Institution in Washington, D.C., has an extensive collection of Arctic materials from Canada and Alaska, including clothing, obtained beginning in 1850. Norwegian polar explorer Roald Amundsen acquired numerous Inuit artifacts, including clothing, during his voyage to the Northwest Passage on the Gjøa from 1903 to 1906, which he brought to the Ethnographic Museum of Norway (now the Museum of Cultural History, Oslo).

Acquisition of Inuit clothing for display began early in Denmark: in the 1620s, Danish naturalist Ole Worm collected samples of Greenlandic Inuit clothing in his cabinet of curiosities, the "Museum Wormianum". Although much of his collection was later acquired by the National Museum of Denmark, the garments he collected are now lost. The skin garment collection of the National Museum is one of the most extensive in the world, containing over 2100 historic skin clothing items from various Arctic cultures, with examples from as early as 1830. In his capacity as head of antiquities at the museum, antiquarian Christian Jürgensen Thomsen was particularly active in increasing the size of this collection in the 1840s. In 1851, Finnish ethnographer Henrik Johan Holmberg acquired several hundred artifacts, including skin garments, from the Alaskan Inuit and the Indigenous peoples of the Pacific Northwest Coast, which Thomsen acquired from him for the Danish National Museum in 1852. Noted anthropological expeditions such as the Gjøa Expedition (1903–1906) and the Fifth Thule Expedition (1921–1924) brought back and donated to the museum a combined total of over 800 North American Inuit garments.

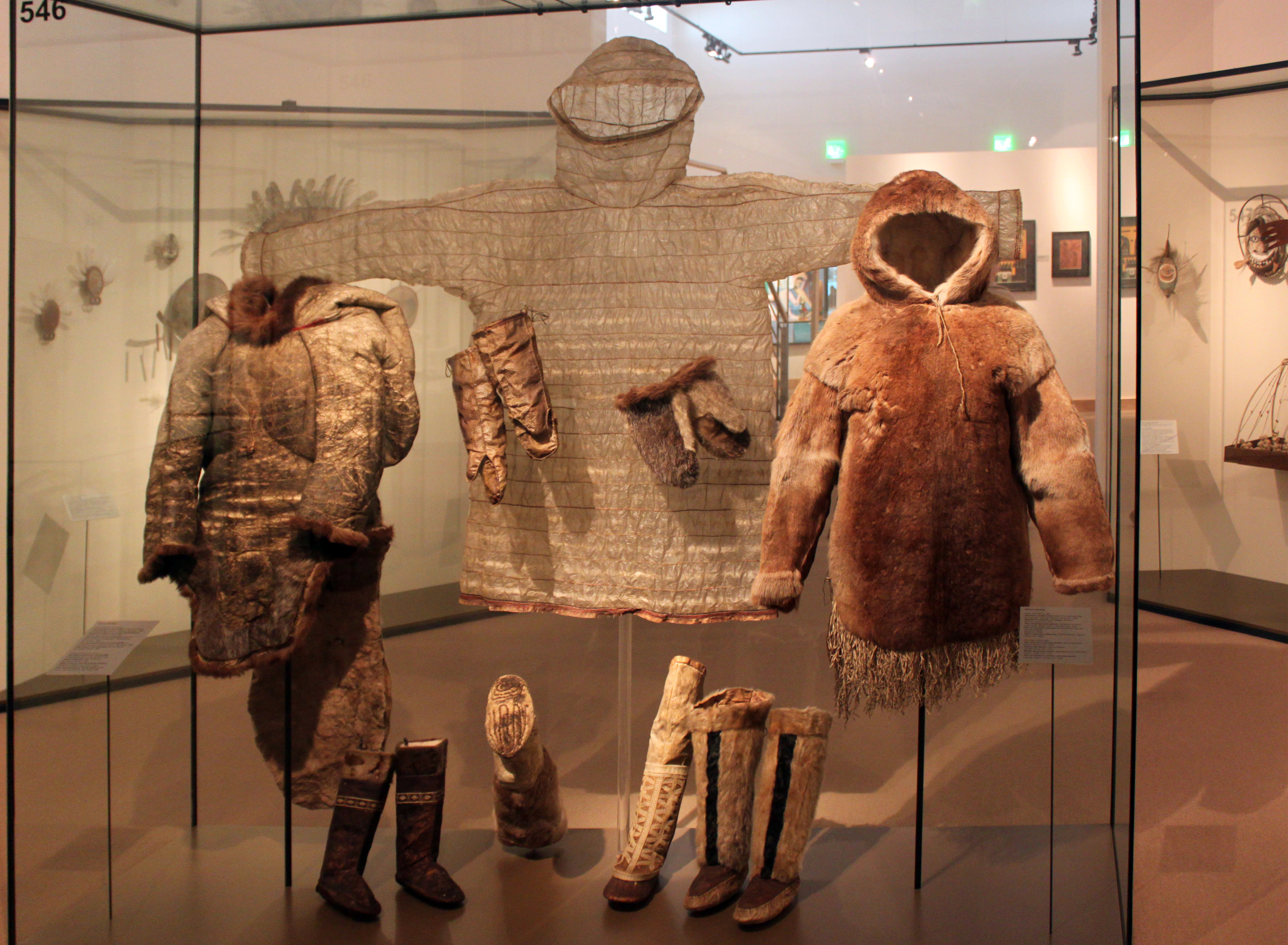
Inuit garments on display at the Ethnological Museum of Berlin

Despite the existence of these extensive collections, throughout the 20th century, many museums rarely displayed Inuit clothing and artifacts. In North America, this only began to change in the 1980s, with the debut of several notable exhibitions. In 1980, the Winnipeg Art Gallery presented The lnuit Amautik: I like my hood to be full, an exhibit focusing on the women's parka, the amauti; in 2020 another exhibition called Inuk Style featured both historical and contemporary Inuit fashion. In 1982, the Smithsonian Museum presented a comprehensive exhibit of Inuit artifacts and clothing, entitled lnua: Spirit World of the Bering Sea Eskimo. In 1994, the Canadian Museum of Civilization, which owns the largest collection of Inuit clothing in North America, featured examples of clothing by the Inuit, Dene, and Nlaka'pamux First Nations in an exhibition titled Threads of the Land, in cooperation with Inuit seamstresses. Since 2016, the Bata Shoe Museum has had a semi-permanent exhibition entitled Art & Innovation: Traditional Arctic Footwear which includes Inuit items collected by Jill Oakes and Rick Riewe from the 1970s to 1990s.

=== Conservation and restoration ===
Preservation of skin clothing, even in a museum, is difficult, because the organic materials used to make the garments are subject to decay, hair loss, and insect infestation if not preserved with enormous care. Historically, garments were often displayed in museums without any protection whatsoever. Storage areas were often poorly maintained, dusty, and full of insects. These poor display and storage methods led to the deterioration or outright loss of many items.

Since the 1960s, methods for storage of cultural heritage objects have become increasingly sophisticated. Skin garments today are typically kept in cold storage facilities when not on display. When on the museum floor, they are kept in airtight showcases with controlled temperature and light intensity. Although protective measures are important, research has found that the original preparation process, as well as previous ordinary use of the garments, are also significant factors which influence the degree of deterioration in skin garments. Driscoll-Engelstad suggested that museums should work with Inuit artisans to conserve and repair damaged clothing and artifacts. Knowledge obtained from preservation of Inuit skin garments, particularly regarding collagen deterioration, has been used to assist in the preservation of important historical documents including the Royal Charter of the Hudson's Bay Company and the United States Declaration of Independence.

== Bibliography ==
=== Books ===
- Driscoll-Engelstad, Bernadette (2010). "Curators, Collections, and Inuit Communities: Case Studies from the Arctic". In Van Broekhoven, Laura; Buijs, Cunera; Hovens, Pieter (eds.). Sharing Knowledge and Cultural Heritage: First Nations of the Americas. Studies in Collaboration with Indigenous Peoples from Greenland, North and South America. Leiden: Sidestone Press. pp. 39–53. ISBN 978-90-8890-066-2.
- Hall, Judy (2001). ""Following The Traditions of Our Ancestors": Inuit Clothing Designs". In Thompson, Judy (ed.). Fascinating Challenges: Studying Material Culture with Dorothy Burnham. Ottawa: University of Ottawa Press. doi:10.2307/j.ctv170p6. ISBN 978-1-77282-300-4. JSTOR j.ctv170p6.
- Hall, Judy; Oakes, Jill E.; Webster, Sally Qimmiu'naaq (1994). Sanatujut: Pride in Women's Work. Copper and Caribou Inuit Clothing Traditions. Hull, Quebec: Canadian Museum of Civilization. ISBN 0-660-14027-6. OCLC 31519648.
- Issenman, Betty Kobayashi; Rankin, Catherine (1988). Ivalu: Traditions Of Inuit Clothing. Montréal: McCord Museum of Canadian History. ISBN 0-7717-0182-9. OCLC 17871781.
- Issenman, Betty Kobayashi (1997). Sinews of Survival: the Living Legacy of Inuit Clothing. Vancouver: UBC Press. ISBN 978-0-7748-5641-6. OCLC 923445644.
- Issenman, Betty Kobayashi (2000). "Many Disciplines, Many Rewards: Inuit Clothing Research". In Eicher, Joanne Bubolz; Evenson, Sandra Lee; Lutz, Hazel A. (eds.). The Visible Self: Global Perspectives on Dress, Culture, and Society. New York : Fairchild Publications. pp. 110–117. ISBN 978-1-56367-068-8 – via Internet Archive.
- King, J.C.H.; Pauksztat, Birgit; Storrie, Robert, eds. (2005). Arctic Clothing. Montreal: McGill-Queen's Press. ISBN 978-0-7735-3008-9.
  - Bahnson, Anne. "Women's Skin Coats from West Greenland – with Special Focus on Formal Clothing of Caribou Skin from the Early Nineteenth Century". Arctic Clothing. pp. 84–90.
  - King, J.C.H. (2005). "Preface and Introduction". Arctic Clothing. McGill-Queen's Press - MQUP. pp. 1–22. ISBN 978-0-7735-3008-9.
  - Klokkernes, Torunn; Sharma, Nalini. "The Roald Amundsen Collection: The Impact of a Skin Preparation Method on Preservation". Arctic Clothing. pp. 91–94.
  - Meeks, Nigel D.; Cartwright, Caroline R. "Caribou and Seal Hair: Examination by Scanning Electron Microscopy". Arctic Clothing. pp. 42–44.
- MacDonald, John; Wachowich, Nancy, eds. (2018). The Hands' Measure: Essays Honouring Leah Aksaajuq Otak's Contribution to Arctic Science. Iqaluit, Nunavut. ISBN 978-1-897568-41-5. OCLC 1080218222.
  - Driscoll-Engelstad, Bernadette. "Restoring an Ancestral Legacy: Museum Collections, Inuit Clothing, and Communities". In MacDonald & Wachowich (2018), pp. 80–111.
- Pharand, Sylvie (2012). Caribou Skin Clothing of the Igloolik Inuit. Iqaluit, Nunavut: Inhabit Media. ISBN 978-1-927095-17-1. OCLC 810526697.
- Rholem, Karim (2001). Uvattinnit: The People of the Far North. Montréal: Stanké. ISBN 2-7604-0794-2. OCLC 46617134.

=== Periodicals ===
- Brubacher, Laura Jane; Dewey, Cate E.; Tatty, Naomi; Healey Akearok, Gwen K.; Cunsolo, Ashlee; Humphries, Sally; Harper, Sherilee L. (December 2021). ""Sewing Is Part of Our Tradition": A Case Study of Sewing as a Strategy for Arts-Based Inquiry in Health Research With Inuit Women". Qualitative Health Research. 31 (14): 2602–2616. doi:10.1177/10497323211042869. ISSN 1049-7323. PMC 8649823. PMID 34605697.
- Buijs, Cunera (2018). "Shared Inuit Culture: European Museums and Arctic Communities". Études/Inuit/Studies. 42 (1): 37–60. doi:10.7202/1064495ar. ISSN 0701-1008. JSTOR 26775760. S2CID 204266425.
- Carlsen, Lars; Feldthus, Anders; Schmidt, Anne Lisbeth (1995). "The Preservation of Inuit Clothing Collected during the Fifth Thule Expedition (1921-24)". Arctic. 48 (4): 333–337. doi:10.14430/arctic1256. ISSN 0004-0843. JSTOR 40511935.
- Cotel, Aline J.; Golingo, Raymond; et al. (2004). "Effect of ancient Inuit fur parka ruffs on facial heat transfer". Climate Research. 26 (1): 77–84. Bibcode:2004ClRes..26...77C. doi:10.3354/cr026077. ISSN 0936-577X. JSTOR 24868710.
- Driscoll-Engelstad, Bernadette (2005). "Dance of the Loon: Symbolism and Continuity in Copper Inuit Ceremonial Clothing". Arctic Anthropology. 42 (1): 33–46. doi:10.1353/arc.2011.0010. ISSN 0066-6939. JSTOR 40316636. S2CID 162200500.
- Emanuelsen, Kristin (2020). The Importance of Sewing: Perspectives from Inuit Women in Ulukhaktok, NT (Report). Ulukhaktok Community Corporation, Indigenous Services Canada, and University of the Sunshine Coast. Archived from the original on 2022-11-28.
- Fienup-Riordan, Ann (1998). "Yup'ik Elders in Museums: Fieldwork Turned on Its Head". Arctic Anthropology. 35 (2): 49–58. ISSN 0066-6939. JSTOR 40316487.
- Harris, Alison J. T.; Fuerborn, Tatiana R.; et al. (September 2020). "Archives of human-dog relationships: Genetic and stable isotope analysis of Arctic fur clothing". Journal of Anthropological Archaeology. 56 101200. Elsevier. doi:10.1016/j.jaa.2020.101200. hdl:109.1.5/5ab2e67e-c8a9-4e03-b6a5-655bfded5b91. ISSN 0278-4165. S2CID 225284575.
- Inch, Jeanne E. (Summer 2013). "Canadian Conservation Institute: Serving Our Clients ... Preserving Canada's Heritage". Collections: A Journal for Museum and Archives Professionals. 9 (3). Sage Publications: 283–298. doi:10.1177/155019061300900304. S2CID 189561372 – via Gale Academic.
- Jensen, K.; Schmidt, A. L.; Petersen, A. H. (October 2013). "Analysis of Traditional Historical Clothing: Automated Production of a Two-dimensional Pattern". Archaeometry. 55 (5): 974–992. doi:10.1111/j.1475-4754.2012.00722.x.
- Oakes, Jill; Wilkins, Heather; et al. (1995). "Comparison of traditional and manufactured cold weather ensembles". Climate Research. 5 (1): 83–90. Bibcode:1995ClRes...5...83O. doi:10.3354/cr005083. ISSN 0936-577X. JSTOR 24863319.
- Schmidt, Anne Lisbeth (2016). "The SkinBase Project: Providing 3D Virtual Access to Indigenous Skin Clothing Collections from the Circumpolar Area". Études/Inuit/Studies. 40 (2): 193–205. doi:10.7202/1055438ar. ISSN 0701-1008. JSTOR 26578202.
- Schmidt, Anne Lisbeth (September 29, 2010). Gulløv, Hans Christian; Paulsen, Caroline; Rønne, Birgit (eds.). Nordlige Verdener: Ændringer og udfordringer [Northern Worlds: Changes and Challenges] (PDF) (Report). National Museum of Denmark.
- Schmidt, Anne Lisbeth (2018). "The Holmberg Collection of Skin Clothing from Kodiak Island at the National Museum of Denmark". Études/Inuit/Studies. 42 (1): 117–136. doi:10.7202/1064498ar. ISSN 0701-1008. JSTOR 26775763. S2CID 204265611.
- Stenton, Douglas R. (1991). "The Adaptive Significance of Caribou Winter Clothing for Arctic Hunter-gatherers". Études/Inuit/Studies. 15 (1): 3–28. JSTOR 42869709.
- Stopp, Marianne P. (March 2009). "Eighteenth century Labrador Inuit in England". Arctic. 62 (1): 45–64. doi:10.14430/arctic112 – via Gale Academic.
- Hill, Richard W.; Tattersall, Glenn J.; et al. (2020-03-18). "Thermal Imaging and Physiological Analysis of Cold-Climate Caribou-Skin Clothing". Arctic. 73 (1): 40–52. doi:10.14430/arctic69909. hdl:10464/14849. ISSN 1923-1245.

=== Websites ===
- Monkman, Lenard (October 29, 2020). "Winnipeg Art Gallery exhibition puts spotlight on Inuit clothing and jewelry". CBC News.
- MacDuffee, Allison (31 August 2018). "The Shaman's Legacy: The Inuit Angakuq Coat from Igloolik". National Gallery of Canada.
- Rogers, Sarah (February 18, 2016). "Fancy footwork: a look at boots around the circumpolar world". Nunatsiaq News.
