= Deco Labels =

Canadian label company

Deco Labels and Flexible Packaging Limited
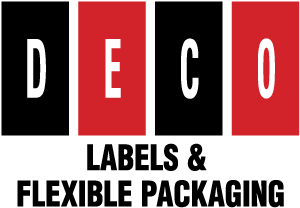
- Type: Private
- Industry: Labels
- Founded: 1962
- Founder: Doug Ford Sr.; Ted Herriott
- Headquarters: Etobicoke, Toronto, Ontario, Canada
- Key people: Doug Ford Sr.; Rob Ford; Doug Ford Jr.; Randy Ford
- Website: https://decolabels.com

Deco Labels and Flexible Packaging Limited (also known as Deco Labels and Tags) is a Canadian label company, specializing in pressure-sensitive labels for plastic-wrapped grocery products, and based in the Etobicoke district of Toronto, Ontario. It is primarily known for its association with the Ford family of Ontario politicians, including Member of Provincial Parliament Doug Ford Sr., Toronto Mayor Rob Ford, and Ontario PC Party Leader and Premier of Ontario Doug Ford Jr. It had annual sales as of 2016 of approximately $100 million per year.

== History ==
Deco was founded in 1962, by Doug Ford Sr. and Ted Herriott. The company was originally a Toronto location for Avery labels, but quickly separated from its parent company. In 1965, Herriott left the company, over a dispute whether it should expand into the tag business. In the following years, it experienced significant growth and success, under the leadership of Doug Sr.

In the 1995, Doug Sr. became MPP for Etobicoke—Humber, and his sons Doug Ford Jr. and Randy Ford assumed control for day-to-day operations of the company. In 1999, the company opened a branch in Chicago, led by Doug Jr. The branch eventually achieved $11 million in annual sales. Further, less successful operations in Ohio and Florida followed. In 2002, Doug Jr. became president of the company, replacing his father. In 2006, Doug Sr., nearing his death, divided up the company, leaving 40% to Doug Jr, 40% to Randy and 20% to Rob Ford (the third brother).

In 2008, Deco purchased Wise Tag and Label, a New Jersey tag business. The acquisition was not successful, and the firing of Wise Tag's manager led to a 2012 lawsuit. In 2010, Doug Jr. was elected Toronto City Councillor (replacing his brother Rob), and Randy took control of day-to-day operations of the company. Former Deco employees suggest that the company was well-managed under Doug Jr., but that the company declined under Randy's leadership. The Toronto division has also struggled to deliver orders on time.

In 2011, Doug Jr. and Rob allegedly used their positions as city councilor and mayor to benefit Deco, in connection with two clients of the company, RR Donnelley and Apollo Health and Beauty Care. An investigation was launched in 2014, and concluded that Doug Jr. broke the code of conduct. In 2018, after being elected Ontario PC leader, Doug Jr. said that he would put his ownership stake in Deco in a trust if elected premier in the upcoming election.

In June 2018, Renata Ford, Rob Ford's widow, launched a $16.25 million lawsuit against Doug and Randy Ford, a few days before the provincial election in which Doug was elected premier. The lawsuit alleges that Doug and Randy were bad managers of Deco Labels, and were guilty of various financial improprieties in their role as trustees of Doug Sr's estate. According to the suit, Deco lost $5.5 million in the six years before 2018, from a total value of $10 million in 2006, due in part to various acquisitions. In order to shore up the company's finances, the lawsuit alleges that the Ford brothers sold other investments owned by Doug Sr's estate. As a result of these activities, the estate declined considerably in value, to the loss of Renata. Doug and Randy deny the allegations, suggesting that they are "completely false".

== Business ==
Deco specializes in producing labels for consumer products, especially in the grocery sector. It also produces labels for the City of Toronto government. Deco is headquartered in Etobicoke, Ontario, with an American office near Chicago, Illinois. It has a 70,000-square foot production facility in Toronto, and a 45,000-square foot facility in Chicago, with a total of 200 employees. The Chicago division was sold to Resource Label Group of Franklin, Tennessee, a portfolio company of alternative investment manager Ares Management Corporation, in October 2022.

As of 2017 the company was jointly owned by Doug Ford Jr. and Randy Ford. According to the June 2018 lawsuit, Doug owned 100% of the Chicago branch, while Randy owned 100% of the Toronto branch. Regulatory filings by Doug Ford Jr. in May 2018 suggested that he was the sole owner of the "Deco Labels and Tags", also known as "Deco Chicago".
