= Rae Luckock =

Canadian politician (1893–1972)

Margarette Rae Morrison Luckock
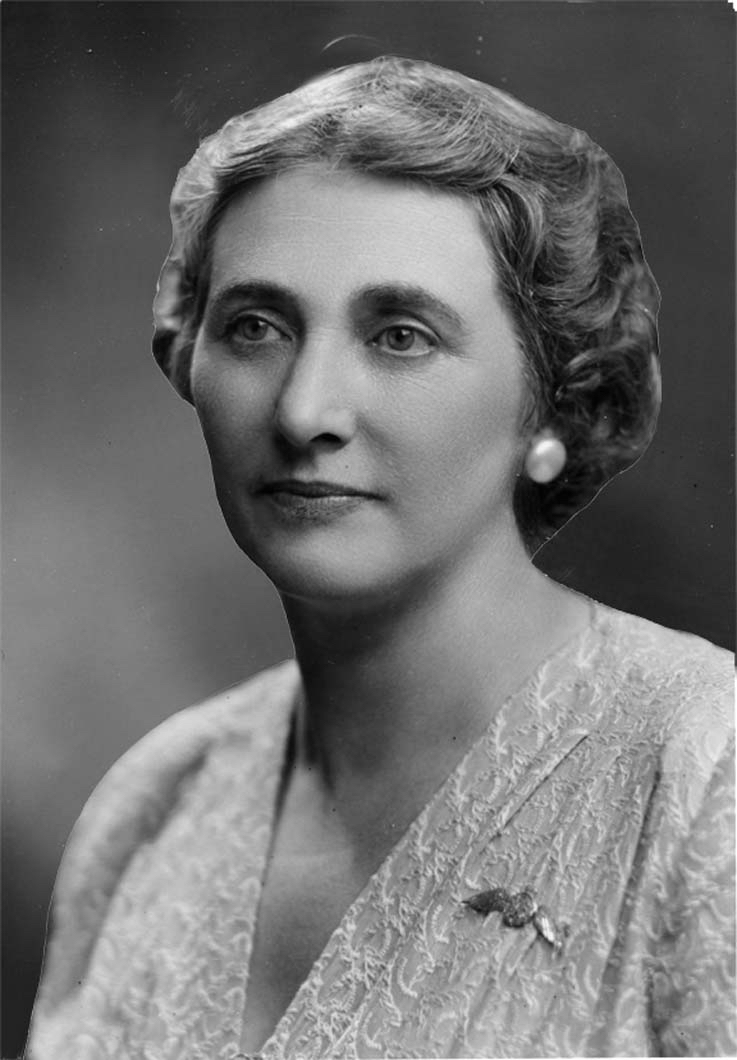
- Official portrait of Rae Luckock, MPP

Member of Provincial Parliament
- In office 1943–1945
- Preceded by: Lionel Conacher
- Succeeded by: Harry Hyland Hyndman
- Constituency: Bracondale

Personal details
- Born: 15 October 1893 Arthur, Ontario
- Died: 24 January 1972 (aged 78) Toronto, Ontario
- Party: Ontario CCF
- Spouse: Richard Luckock
- Occupation: Politician, Activist, Seamstress

Margarette Rae Morrison Luckock (15 October 1893 – 24 January 1972) known as Rae Luckock. She was a feminist, social justice activist, peace activist and, with Agnes Macphail, one of the first two women elected to the Legislative Assembly of Ontario, in 1943. A member of the Co-operative Commonwealth Federation (Ontario Section), also known as the Ontario CCF, Luckock was elected to the Ontario legislature in the 1943 Ontario general election representing Toronto's Bracondale constituency (riding). She served as a Member of Provincial Parliament (MPP) until she was defeated in the 1945 Ontario general election. She became the Congress of Canadian Women's founding president in 1950 and became a victim of the Cold War's anti-communist hysteria when she was denied entry into the United States, because she travelled to "Red" China and invited Soviet women to visit Canada. She contracted Parkinson's disease in the mid-1950s and mostly was bedridden until her death in 1972.

== Background and early life ==
Luckock was raised on a family farm in Arthur, Ontario. Her father, James J. Morrison, was a founder of the United Farmers of Ontario and served as the party's general secretary during the UFO's years in power and was leader of the party that won the 1919 Ontario election (he declined being Premier of Ontario).

In 1914, she married Richard Luckock, a tool-and-die maker, and the couple ultimately settled in Toronto on 527 Crawford Street in west end.

Luckock worked as a seamstress during the Great Depression but had to go on social relief when she became unemployed. During this period, her daughter contracted scarlet fever and died. The tragedy motivated Luckock's lifelong fight for social programs.

== Co-operative Commonwealth Federation ==
Rae Luckock joined the Co-operative Commonwealth Federation (CCF) at its inception in 1932 and served as a local party activist. She ran for the Toronto school board five times before winning election as a trustee on her sixth try in January 1943. Later that year she was the CCF's successful candidate in Bracondale for the provincial election and resigned her position on the school board.

=== Elected to Legislative Assembly of Ontario ===
The 1943 Ontario general election was a major breakthrough for the Ontario CCF propelling them to official opposition status in a minority legislature with 34 seats.

On 4 August 1943, Luckock and Agnes Macphail were both elected to the provincial legislature for the first time, and became the first two women ever to serve as Members of Provincial Parliament (MPPs). As new MPPs were usually sworn in by alphabetical order, Luckock was due to become the first woman ever sworn in as an MPP, but she deferred to Macphail in recognition of the latter's long career as a federal Member of Parliament. Luckock was thus the second woman to take the MPP's oath.

In the legislature, Luckock served as the CCF's education critic and promoted the idea of free university tuition and improved rural education. She also opposed Premier Drew's education curriculum change that introduced a religious education course that could promote antisemitism. She also championed the equality of women by advocating equal pay for equal work and pay for homemakers.

On 4 June 1945, Luckock lost her re-election attempt in the Bracondale constituency to Royal Canadian Navy Lieutenant, Harry Hyland Hyndman of the Progressive Conservative Party. The 1945 Ontario general election reduced the CCF caucus to only eight MPPs and third party status.

She served as president of the Housewives and Consumers Association (HCA) from 1943 to 1944, and organized its 1948 "March of a Million Names" campaign that petitioned the federal government to lower the price of consumer goods. A million names were gathered for the petition which was presented to Prime Minister William Lyon Mackenzie King by Luckock at a large rally on Parliament Hill.

Her work as the president of the HCA drew the ire of the CCF, including her electoral district association. She lost the Ontario CCF's Bracondale nomination on 29 April 1948 at what she called an illegal meeting that didn't have quorum nor sufficient notice. However, she didn't formally protest Harry Walters nomination, and he went on to win the election on 7 June 1948.

== Alleged Communist affiliations ==
Members of the communist Labor-Progressive Party were involved in the HCA leading it to be labelled a "communist front". The CCF had actively purged suspected Communists from its ranks since its founding and Luckock's involvement with the HCA brought her under suspicion and resulting in demands that she choose between leaving the HCA or being expelled from the CCF. Luckock chose the HCA and was expelled from the CCF in 1948. The party had a resurgence of fortunes in that year's provincial election and regained her riding of Bracondale but with Harry Walters as the new CCF standard-bearer instead of Luckock.

The HCA joined with other women's groups to form the Congress of Canadian Women in 1950, and Luckock was elected its first president. The Congress was involved with the peace movement during the Cold War, and facilitated meetings between people from the Soviet Union and Canadians, by inviting them to visit Canada.

=== Banned from US ===
Luckock attended conferences of the (World Peace Council), including one in the People's Republic of China in 1956 as well as Copenhagen (1953), and Warsaw, Poland (1950). As a result, she was blacklisted, and was once barred from entry into the United States. She successfully argued that she should be allowed in.

Luckock was diagnosed with Parkinson's disease shortly after her trip to China and spent the last years of her life in hospital. She died in Toronto on 24 January 1972, at the chronic care Queen Elizabeth Hospital in Parkdale, and was laid to rest in her hometown of Arthur, Ontario.

== See also ==
- List of peace activists
