= List of reeves and mayors of Etobicoke =

The township of Etobicoke, Ontario came into existence in 1850 and was led by a township reeve from 1850 to 1967. From 1967 to 1983 the Borough of Etobicoke (City of Etobicoke after 1983) was led by a mayor until Etobicoke's amalgamation into the City of Toronto in 1998:

Reeves

- 1850 William Gamble - merchant, miller, and land developer. Owner of the Milton Mill on the Humber River consisting of a sawmill, nail factory, inn, stables, and store, and later a gristmill, distillery and hotel. Began the development of Mimico and, as plankmaster, built plank roads in the township.
- 1851–1854 Joseph Smith
- 1855–1857 Alexander McFarlane
- 1858–1864 Edward Musson - born in London, England and immigrated to Canada in 1820. Settled in Islington in 1840 where he made a living farming, running a saw mill and keeping a store. Was also the first town clerk and postmaster.
- 1865–1870, 1874–1876 William Wallis
- 1871–1872, 1877–1884 Matthew Canning - Born in New York City of Irish parents; the family moved to Etobicoke when he was a child. Canning was a farmer and owned a sawmill. Joined Etobicoke council in 1854 and spent 16 years as a councillor, 4 as deputy reeve, and 10 as reeve and was nicknamed "the Father of Etobicoke". Donated land for the construction of Richview's first brick schoolhouse.
- 1873 John Clark - was a market gardener
- 1885–1896, 1907 John Dillon Evans - Immigrated from Ireland. Was a beekeeper Warden of York County in 1890
- 1897–1900 David L. Streight
- 1901 John T. Carr
- 1902–1905 John Bryans
- 1906 Franklin E. Shaver - farmer, bought the first car in Etobicoke, a Studebaker-Flanders, ca. 1909
- 1908, 1910–1912 John Gardhouse - Father of future reeve William Gardhouse. Gardhouse was a prominent cattle breeder who was inducted into the Canadian Agricultural Hall of Fame, and co-founder of the Royal Agricultural Winter Fair. Also served as Warden of York County. Later moved to Weston and served as chair of the Toronto Board of Education in 1917 and as mayor of Weston in 1919 and 1920.
- 1909 Russell S. Warner
- 1913–1917 Charles Silverthorn - was killed in 1917 when his car collided with a Toronto to Guelph radial streetcar at a rail crossing.
- 1918 James Dandridge - was a market gardener
- 1919–1920 William G. Jackson - Later was mayor of New Toronto (1929–1937, 1938–1952).
- 1921–1924, 1932 William James Gardhouse - son of former reeve John Gardhouse. Also served as Warden of York County. Later was Liberal MPP for York West (1934-1943).
- 1925–1926 Thomas A.C. Tier
- 1927–1929 J. Ray Price - Brick manufacturer. Served as Warden of York County. Would later be the Conservative candidate in York West in the 1934 provincial election and would be defeated by another former reeve, William James Gardhouse.
- 1930–1931 Robert Marshall - farmer
- 1933 William Clarkson
- 1934–1936, 1938–1943 William A. Armstrong - "During the Depression, he was forcibly confined for 18 hours in an Alderwood school by unemployed residents."
- 1937 William L. Stephens - farmer
- 1943–1946 Frank A.C. Butler - Owner of Butler Funeral Home
- 1947–1952 Clive M. Sinclair, K.C. - Lawyer and school trustee. Also served as warden of York County. Later appointed to Toronto Transit Commission (1954–1960).
- 1953–1956 Bev Lewis - Former pressman and union leader, later was involved with construction and land development and owned a bowling alley in New Toronto. Served as Progressive Conservative MPP for Humber (1955–1967). Retired to Mara Township on the shores of Lake Simcoe where he was reeve until his death.
- 1957–1962 Henry Oscar (Ozzie) Waffle - died in 1980, aged 60. Was a RCAF pilot during World War II. Owned a Ford dealership, Thorncrest Motors. He launched a legal challenge to Dennis Flynn's 1972 election, which resulted in his disqualification and the holding of a new election in 1973, which Flynn won. Waffle was chairman of the Metropolitan Civil Defence Organization and then the Metro Emergency Measures Organization at the height of the Cold War.
- 1963–1966 John P. MacBeth - lawyer, and later Progressive Conservative MPP for Humber (1971–1975)

Mayors

- 1967–1972 Edward Austin Horton - first mayor of the amalgamated Borough of Etobicoke, former deputy minister of municipal affairs and public welfare (1937–1941) and business owner.
- 1973–1983 C. Dennis Flynn - Previously protocol officer for City of Toronto. Became Metro Toronto chairman (1984–1987) and Metro councillor (1988–1997)
- 1984–1994 Bruce Sinclair (effective September 4, 1984) After amalgamation sat as Toronto city councillor (1998–2000)
- 1994–1998 Doug Holyday - After amalgamation served as a Toronto city councillor (1998–2013) and was the MPP for Etobicoke—Lakeshore (2013–2014).

== See also ==
- Etobicoke Board of Control
