= Morley Kells =

Canadian politician

The Honourable Morley Kells ECO

Member of the Ontario Provincial Parliament
- In office 1995–2003
- Preceded by: Ruth Grier
- Succeeded by: Laurel Broten
- Constituency: Etobicoke—Lakeshore
- In office 1981–1985
- Preceded by: John MacBeth
- Succeeded by: Jim Henderson
- Constituency: Humber

Personal details
- Born: January 26, 1936 (age 90) Midland, Ontario
- Party: Progressive Conservative
- Occupation: Journalist

Morley Kells (born January 26, 1936) is a former politician in Ontario, Canada. He was a Progressive Conservative member of the Legislative Assembly of Ontario on two separate occasions from 1981 to 1985 and again from 1995 to 2003, and was briefly a cabinet minister in the government of Frank Miller. He was an unsuccessful candidate for Toronto City Council in the 2010 municipal election.

== Background ==
Kells was born in Midland, Ontario in 1936. He was raised in the village of Mimico in the southern part of Etobicoke in west Toronto, Ontario. While in Mimico High School, Morley was initiated into Gamma Sigma Fraternity International, Beta Nu Chapter in 1953. Kells went on to lead the fraternity as Grand President while an active member over many years with the fraternity. Morley attended the 150th anniversary of the founding of Gamma Sigma, in Niagara Falls Ontario in October 2019 with a large group of alumni.

He was a lacrosse player from 1954 to 1961. In 1955 became a Minto Cup champion with the Canadian Junior Lacrosse Long Branch team. He worked as a coach in the 1960s and 1970s, and started the semi-professional Ontario Lacrosse Association in 1972. In 1974–75, he co-founded the National Lacrosse League, with six teams in Canada and the United States. He received the Lester B. Pearson Award for contribution to sport in 1973, and was named to the Canadian Lacrosse Hall of Fame in 1976.

Kells also worked as a journalist, writing for The Telegram newspaper and serving as communications accounting executive for MacLaren Advertising. From 1965 to 1970, he served as the creative director for Hockey Night in Canada. From 1990 to 1995, he served as president of the Urban Development Institute of Ontario.

== Municipal politics ==
He was elected as an alderman in Etobicoke in 1976, and won a controller's seat in 1978. Kells ran for mayor of Etobicoke in 1980, but was defeated by incumbent Dennis Flynn.

He was an unsuccessful candidate for Toronto City Council for Ward 5 (Etobicoke Lakeshore), seeking to unseat incumbent councillor Peter Milczyn in the October 25, 2010 municipal election.

2010 Toronto election, Ward 5
Candidate	Votes	%
Peter Milczyn	9,778	41.16
Justin Di Ciano	9,669	40.70
Morley Kells	2,725	11.47
John Chiappetta	1,245	5.24
Rob Therrien	339	1.43
Total	23,756	100.00

== Provincial politics ==
Kells ran for the Ontario legislature in the provincial election of 1971, losing to New Democratic Party candidate Patrick Lawlor by 735 votes in the Etobicoke riding of Lakeshore.

=== 1981–1985 ===
Kells was elected to the Ontario legislature in the provincial election of 1981, outpolling Liberal candidate Jim Mills by over 10,000 votes in the Etobicoke riding of Humber. He was made a parliamentary assistant in 1983. Kells supported Frank Miller's successful campaign for the party leadership in January 1985

Premier Miller appointed Kells Minister of the Environment in his new government on February 8, 1985. Kells' time in cabinet was short-lived. He was not well respected by his staff, and made a rather serious public relations blunder in March 1985. Commenting on a major PCB spill in northern Ontario, he said, "If you're a rat eating PCBs on the TransCanada, you might have some problems." This was widely interpreted as reflecting a lack of concern for serious environmental issues, and did considerable damage to the Miller government.

Early in his ministerial tenure, Kells had intended to announce a $100-million cash infusion for his ministry, with the money to be spent cleaning polluted dump sites and hiring new inspectors. The announcement was postponed, however, when the Miller government decided to de-emphasize social initiatives in favour of fiscal responsibility in the 1985 campaign.

Kells would never get the chance to deliver this message. He lost to Liberal candidate Jim Henderson by almost 2,000 votes in the 1985 provincial election, in which the Tories were reduced to a minority.

Miller ministry, Province of Ontario (1985)
Cabinet post (1)
Predecessor	Office	Successor
Andy Brandt	Minister of Environment; 1985 (February–May)	Susan Fish

=== 1995–2003 ===
In the provincial election of 1995, Kells ran as the Progressive Conservative candidate in the riding of Etobicoke—Lakeshore, and defeated incumbent New Democrat Ruth Grier and Liberal Bruce Davis by a significant margin. He was reportedly annoyed at not being appointed to the cabinet of Mike Harris, however, and played only a limited role in the parliament that followed. He did not serve as a parliamentary assistant, and did not even serve on any committees after 1997. He did serve as a member of the Red Tape Commission of MPPs.

Kells' riding was targeted by both the Liberal and NDP in the 1999 provincial election, but he managed to win re-election by a significant margin (defeating Liberal Laurel Broten by almost 5,000 votes). Once again, he played only a limited role in the parliament which followed.

The Tories had lost much of their Toronto-area support by the time of the 2003 election, and Kells lost to Broten by just over 5,000 votes in a rematch from 1999.

== Federal politics ==
Morley Kells was a candidate for the nomination of the Conservative Party of Canada in Etobicoke-Lakeshore on May 5, 2005, although he was defeated by the 2004 federal candidate John Capobianco.
