= Dennis Flynn =

Dennis Flynn may refer to:

- Dennis Flynn (Canadian politician) (1923–2003), Canadian politician in Ontario
- Dennis Thomas Flynn (1861–1939), American politician from Oklahoma
- Dennis J. Flynn (born 1942), American lawyer and judge in Wisconsin

== See also ==
- Denny Flynn (born 1951), American rodeo cowboy
