= Susan Fish =

Canadian politician

The Honourable Susan Fish ECO

Ontario MPP
- In office 1981–1987
- Preceded by: Margaret Campbell
- Succeeded by: Riding abolished
- Constituency: St. George

Alderman, City of Toronto, Ward 5 (with Ying Hope)
- In office 1976–1987
- Preceded by: Margaret Campbell
- Succeeded by: Riding abolished
- Constituency: St. George

Personal details
- Born: March 21, 1945 (age 81) Rio de Janeiro, Brazil
- Party: Progressive Conservative
- Spouse: Christopher Fish (div.)
- Profession: Executive director

Susan de Avellar Schiller (born March 21, 1945), formerly Susan Fish, is a Canadian politician. She served in the Legislative Assembly of Ontario from 1981 to 1987, and was a cabinet minister in the governments of Bill Davis and Frank Miller.

== Background ==
Schiller was born Susan Avellar Keddy in Rio de Janeiro, Brazil, in 1945 to an Irish-American sailor father and a Brazilian mother. She was raised in Carle Place and Levittown, New York. Her parents separated when she was three years old and her mother married a professional boxer and union organizer when she was nine.

She attended St. Lawrence College where she received a degree in political science and obtained a master's degree in public administration at New York University. She married Christopher Fish and the couple moved to Toronto to start a new life. Christopher returned to New York shortly thereafter, but Fish stayed and started work at the Bureau of Municipal Research. She became executive director at age 23. In 1973, she started working as a policy advisor for David Crombie, the pro-reform Mayor of Toronto. She became a naturalized Canadian citizen in 1976.

== Politics ==
Schiller, using her then-married name Susan Fish, was elected to Toronto City Council as a reform alderman in 1976 and served until 1980.

Like Crombie, she was a Red Tory. She ran for Bill Davis' Progressive Conservative Party of Ontario in the 1981 Ontario election and was elected as Member of Provincial Parliament (MPP) for the St. George constituency in downtown Toronto. Shortly after her election, she participated in a rally at Queen's Park to support the inclusion of sexual identity in the Ontario Human Rights Code.

On July 6, 1983, she was promoted to the Davis cabinet as Minister of Citizenship and Culture. She supported her friend Larry Grossman in his unsuccessful bid to succeed Davis in 1985. Nonetheless, she retained her cabinet post under the new Frank Miller government when he announced his cabinet on February 8, 1985.

Schiller was re-elected with a reduced plurality in the 1985 election. On May 17, 1985, she was named as Minister of the Environment in Miller's short-lived minority government. After the Tories were defeated by a motion of no confidence in June 1985, she continued to serve in the legislature as an opposition MPP. She was defeated in the 1987 Ontario election by Liberal Attorney General Ian Scott, by a margin of 7,055 votes in the redistributed constituency of St. George—St. David.

=== Cabinet positions ===
Miller ministry, Province of Ontario (1985)
Cabinet post (1)
| Predecessor | Office | Successor |
|---|---|---|
| Morley Kells | Minister of Environment; 1985 (May–June) | Jim Bradley |
Davis ministry, Province of Ontario (1971–1985)
Cabinet post (1)
| Predecessor | Office | Successor |
| Bruce McCaffrey | Minister of Citizenship and Culture; 1983–1985 | Nick Leluk |

She returned to politics in the 1991 municipal election when she ran for Mayor of Toronto against Jack Layton, June Rowlands and Betty Disero. Fearing a Layton victory, the business and development community consolidated its support and funding behind Rowlands as the "Anybody but Layton" candidate, forcing Disero and Schiller to drop out of the race due to lack of resources.

== Later life ==
Schiller has served on the Ontario Land Tribunal (formerly the Ontario Municipal Board) from 2005 to 2021. She also serves on the board of Harbourfront Corp., the Metro Action Committee on Public Violence Against Women and Children, and Casey House.

In February 2018, as a member of the Local Planning Appeal Tribunal, she ruled in favour of a 26-storey condominium in Burlington's downtown, in an area zoned for 4 storeys. She justified her ruling by employing two controversial arguments (a columnist called her decision "scary"). First, a city's official plan doesn't matter; what matters is the proposed application conforms to provincial growth policy [Clause 39]. Second, she argued that provincial policy says there are no height maximums in urban growth centres and mobility hubs [Clause 54].
