= George Ben =

Canadian politician

Ontario MPP
- In office 1967–1971
- Preceded by: Bev Lewis
- Succeeded by: Nick Leluk
- Constituency: Humber
- In office 1965–1967
- Preceded by: Joseph Gould
- Succeeded by: Riding abolished
- Constituency: Bracondale

Personal details
- Born: September 5, 1925 Slovakia
- Died: December 17, 1978 (aged 53) Toronto, Ontario
- Party: Liberal
- Spouse: Ruby Elizabeth Hall (m. 1952)
- Occupation: Lawyer

Military service
- Allegiance: Canadian
- Branch/service: Royal Canadian Air Force
- Years of service: 1942-1945
- Rank: Gunner
- Battles/wars: World War II

George Ben (September 5, 1925 – December 17, 1978) was an Ontario lawyer and political figure. He represented Bracondale and then Humber in the Legislative Assembly of Ontario from 1965 as a Liberal member until his defeat in the 1971 provincial election. Ben was a member of Toronto City Council in the early 1960s, representing Ward 5, and returned to council in the 1972 municipal election. He was re-elected for the final time in 1978, and died in office on December 17, 1978.

== Background ==
Ben was born in Slovakia, the son of John Ben. Ben was educated in Toronto, at the University of Toronto and was trained as lawyer at Osgoode Hall Law School. He served in World War II in the Royal Canadian Air Force as a gunner in a bomber. In 1952, he married Ruby Elizabeth Hall.

== Politics ==
Ben was first elected to Toronto City Council in 1962, representing Ward 5, placing first, which meant he was also concurrently a member of Metropolitan Toronto Council. In 1964, he ran for Toronto's Board of Control, but lost.

In 1965, after the death of Liberal MPP Joseph Gould, he won the Liberal Party of Ontario's nomination for the Bracondale constituency. He won the September 15 by-election, becoming the last MPP from Bracondale, as the constituency was redistributed out of existence for the 1967 Ontario general election.

He decided to run in the Humber constituency in 1967, which did not contain any part of his previous one. The constituency was located in Toronto's west-end, incorporating the old village of Swansea, parts of Etobiocke, and the City of York. He was up against a three-term Progressive Conservative Party of Ontario incumbent, Bev Lewis – the former five-term Reeve of the old Etobicoke Township. Ben won a very tight race, but not as was expected. He unseated Lewis, but the real surprise was that the incumbent came in third place. Ben narrowly defeated New Democratic Party of Ontario (NDP) candidate Kealey Cummings by 149 votes.

== Later life ==
In 1978, Ben ran again for Toronto City Council in Ward 4, approximately the southern portion of his old Bracondale constituency's boundaries. In the November council elections, he placed second to future Toronto mayor Art Eggleton, making him the junior alderman for the ward. Only about a month later, Ben had a heart attack and died in St. Joseph's hospital on December 17. His death forced the adjournment of the next-day's council meeting. His funeral was on December 20, attended by three former mayors and most of city council. The City of Toronto named a parkette for him, the George Ben parkette in his old neighbourhood.

Ben is interred in the Park Lawn Cemetery in Etobicoke.
