= Bracondale =

Former provincial electoral district in Ontario, Canada

Ontario electoral district
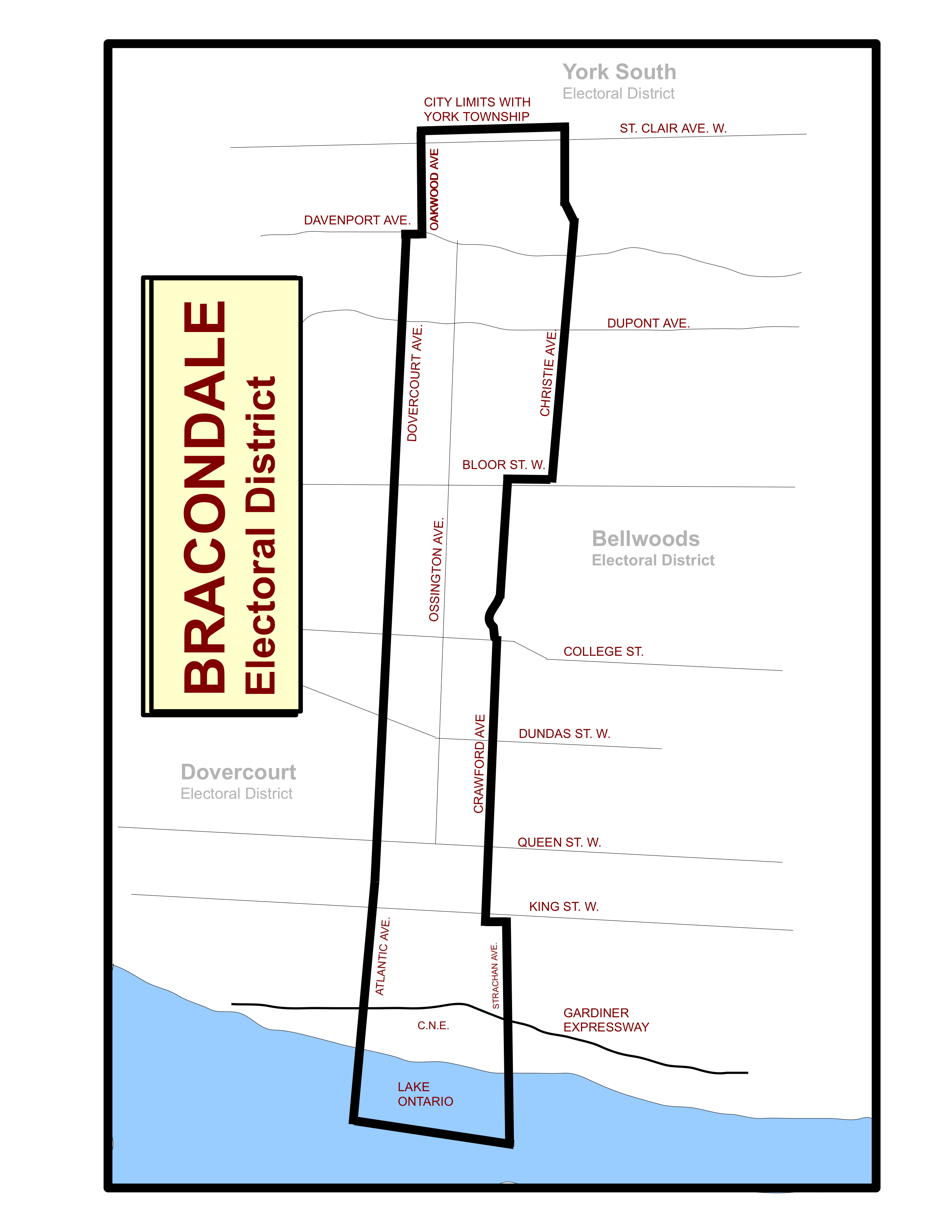
- Bracondale electoral district as it appeared from 1934 until its abolition in 1967

Defunct provincial electoral district
- Legislature: Legislative Assembly of Ontario
- District created: 1925
- District abolished: 1967
- First contested: 1926
- Last contested: 1965

Bracondale was a provincial electoral district in Toronto, Ontario, Canada. It was represented in the Legislative Assembly of Ontario from 1926 to 1967. The constituency got its name from an old Toronto suburb called Bracondale, that was annexed by Toronto in 1909. Its most notable event was electing one of the first two women Members of the Provincial Parliament (MPP) to share the title "first-woman MPP" in 1943 when Rae Luckock was elected. In 1965, Bracondale's MPP, Joseph Gould, died in office sparking the final election held in the constituency. George Ben won the by-election, and became the constituency's last MPP. It was abolished for the 1967 Ontario provincial election, and redistributed into the Dovercourt and Bellwoods constituencies. As of 2023, the current electoral districts of Davenport, St. Paul's, University–Rosedale, and Spadina–Fort York encompass this historic riding.

== History ==
Bracondale was the name of a former Toronto suburb that was annexed by the city in 1909; and north of Davenport Road, constituted the northern part of what eventually became the provincial electoral district. It was part of the northwestern expansion of the city that included Wychwood Park, and the City of West Toronto (now known as The Junction). The constituency was first contested during Ontario's 17th general election on 1 December 1926. Arthur Russell Nesbitt, was elected its first Member of the Legislative Assembly (MLA). He was a member of Ontario Conservative Party. The constituency's first Ontario Liberal MLA was Lionel Conacher, a famous Canadian athlete that retired from the National Hockey League to start a career in politics. He was elected on 6 October 1937 in a very close race with the constituency's incumbent MLA, Nesbitt. Nesbitt claimed that two ballot boxes were missing and one was filled with fraudulent ballots. The constituency's returning officer was arrested, and denied bail because he had a quantity of ballots stuffed in his pockets. Soon after Conacher was elected as an MLA, the legislature changed the designation for its members to Member of Provincial Parliament (MPP) in 1938.

Bracondale's most notable event came in 1943. Its residents elected Rae Luckock, one of two Co-operative Commonwealth Federation (CCF) female MPPs to share the title "first-female MPP"; the other was Agnes Macphail in York East. Luckock lost the 4 June 1945 provincial election to Conservative Harry Hyland Hyndman, which saw the Conservatives sweep into a majority government, by gaining most of the extra seats from the CCF.

== Boundaries ==
The original boundaries for Bracondale, used for the 1926 and 1929 elections

=== 1926 to 1934 boundaries ===
Bracondale was a long and narrow constituency, ranging from the Canadian National Exhibition Grounds in the south to the city limits at St. Clair Avenue in the north, in Toronto's west-end. It included parts of the present-day neighbourhoods of Bracondale Hill, Davenport, Dovercourt Park, Dufferin Grove, Little Portugal, and Liberty Village. Its southern boundary was Lake Ontario. Its eastern boundary started on the west side of Strachan Avenue. It went north on Strachan to Queen Street West and jogged westward along Queen's south side to Crawford Avenue. It then went north on Crawford's west side until Dundas Street West, where it went eastward along the northern section of Dundas to Beatrice Street. It went north on Beatrice's west side straight through to Bloor Street West. It then jogged east on Bloor's north side to Christie Avenue. It then went along Christie to the northern boundary, the city limits just north of St. Clair Avenue West. It jogged westward along the city limits to Oakwood Avenue. It then went south along Oakwood's eastside to Davenport Road. It then jogged along Davenport's south-side to Dovercourt Road. It then went south on Dovercourt's east-side to Atlantic Avenue. On Atlantic's east-side to Lake Ontario.

=== 1934 to 1967 Boundaries ===
Bracondale in context with the other Toronto districts in 1926 and 1929

Bracondale was a long and narrow constituency, ranging from the Canadian National Exhibition Grounds in the south to the city limits immediately north of St. Clair Avenue, in Toronto's west-end. It included parts of the present-day neighbourhoods that belong to Bracondale Hill, Davenport, Dovercourt Park, Dufferin Grove, Little Portugal, and Liberty Village. Its southern boundary was Lake Ontario. Its eastern boundary started on the west-side of Strachan Avenue. It went north on Strachan to Queen Street West and jogged westward along Queen's south side to Crawford Avenue. It then went north on Crawford's westside until Bloor Street West. It then jogged east on Bloor's north side to Christie Avenue. It then went along Christie to the northern boundary, the city limits just north of St. Clair Avenue West. It jogged westward along the city limits to Oakwood Avenue. It then went south along Oakwood's eastside to Davenport Road. It then jogged along Davenport's south-side to Dovercourt Road. It then went south on Dovercourt's east-side to Atlantic Avenue. On Atlantic's east-side to Lake Ontario.

In 2012, the historic boundaries are approximately part of the south-east portion of the present-day Davenport constituency, a portion of the southern section of St. Paul's constituency, and most of the western portion of the Trinity–Spadina constituency.

== Members of Provincial Parliament ==
Bracondale
Assembly	Years	Member	Party
Prior to 1926 part of Toronto Southwest and Toronto Northwest ridings
17th	1926–1929	Arthur Russell Nesbitt	Conservative
18th	1929–1934	Arthur Russell Nesbitt	Conservative
19th	1934–1937	Arthur Russell Nesbitt	Conservative
20th	1937–1943	Lionel Conacher	Liberal
21st	1943–1945	Rae Luckock	Co-operative Commonwealth
22nd	1945–1948	Harry Hyland Hyndman	Progressive Conservative
23rd	1948–1951	Harry Lindley Walters	Co-operative Commonwealth
24th	1951–1955	Arthur George Frost	Progressive Conservative
25th	1955–1959	Arthur George Frost	Progressive Conservative
26th	1959–1963	Joseph Gould	Liberal
27th	1963–1965	Joseph Gould	Liberal
27th	1965–1967	George Ben	Liberal
Sourced from the Ontario Legislative Assembly
Merged into Bellwoods and Dovercourt ridings after 1967

== Election results ==
Ontario provincial by-election, September 15, 1965 Death of Joseph Gould
Party	Candidate	Votes	%	±%
Liberal	George Ben	4,940	46.35	+8.03
New Democratic	John Farina	3,486	32.70	+8.71
Progressive Conservative	Lawrence Odette	2,233	20.95	–16.74
Total valid votes		10,659	97.81	
Total rejected ballots		239	2.19	+0.81
Turnout		10,898	64.92	+3.59
Eligible voters		16,786		
Liberal hold		Swing		–0.34
Source: Elections Ontario

1963 Ontario general election
Party	Candidate	Votes	%	±%
Liberal	Joseph Gould	4,271	38.31	+1.73
Progressive Conservative	Stanley Frolick	4,202	37.69	+4.62
New Democratic	Stan Matias	2,675	24.00	–2.30
Total valid votes		11,148	98.62	
Total rejected ballots		156	1.38	–1.14
Turnout		11,304	61.33	+4.93
Eligible voters		18,430		
Liberal hold		Swing		–1.45
Source: Elections Ontario

1959 Ontario general election
Party	Candidate	Votes	%	±%
Liberal	Joseph Gould	4,069	36.59	+11.02
Progressive Conservative	Harold Menzies	3,678	33.07	–7.33
Co-operative Commonwealth	John Elchuk	2,925	26.30	–2.71
Independent	Robert Martin	450	4.05	–
Total valid votes		11,122	97.48	
Total rejected ballots		287	2.52	+0.60
Turnout		11,409	56.40	+1.16
Eligible voters		20,227		
Liberal gain from Progressive Conservative		Swing		+9.18
Source: Elections Ontario

1955 Ontario general election
Party	Candidate	Votes	%	±%
Progressive Conservative	Arthur George Frost	4,727	40.40	–1.77
Co-operative Commonwealth	Thomas Paton	3,394	29.01	–1.49
Liberal	George Ben	2,991	25.56	–1.77
Labor–Progressive	Harry Hunter	588	5.03	–
Total valid votes		11,700	98.09	
Total rejected ballots		228	1.91	+0.17
Turnout		11,928	55.24	–3.89
Eligible voters		21,592		
Progressive Conservative hold		Swing		–0.14
Source: Elections Ontario

1951 Ontario general election
Party	Candidate	Votes	%	±%
Progressive Conservative	Arthur George Frost	6,213	42.17	+3.86
Co-operative Commonwealth	Harry Lindley Walters	4,493	30.49	–14.51
Liberal	Frank Mills	4,028	27.34	+10.64
Total valid votes		14,734	98.26	
Total rejected ballots		261	1.74	+0.53
Turnout		14,995	59.13	–4.84
Eligible voters		25,358		
Progressive Conservative gain from Co-operative Commonwealth		Swing		+9.19
Source: Elections Ontario

1948 Ontario general election
Party	Candidate	Votes	%	±%
Co-operative Commonwealth	Harry Lindley Walters	7,956	45.00	+18.14
Progressive Conservative	Frederick J. Conboy	6,772	38.30	+2.69
Liberal	William Alexander Gunn	2,952	16.70	–4.99
Total valid votes		17,680	98.79	
Total rejected ballots		216	1.21	–0.43
Turnout		17,896	63.97	–6.23
Eligible voters		27,975		
Co-operative Commonwealth gain from Progressive Conservative		Swing		+7.73
Source: Elections Ontario

1945 Ontario general election
Party	Candidate	Votes	%	±%
Progressive Conservative	Harry Hyland Hyndman	6,600	35.61	–0.59
Co-operative Commonwealth	Rae Luckock	4,978	26.86	–11.70
Liberal	Lionel Conacher	4,019	21.69	–1.09
Labor–Progressive	Leslie Morris	2,607	14.07	–
Independent	Charles H. Graham	328	1.77	–
Total valid votes		18,532	98.37	
Total rejected ballots		308	1.63	+0.37
Turnout		18,840	70.20	+20.65
Eligible voters		26,839		
Progressive Conservative gain from Co-operative Commonwealth		Swing		+5.56
Source: Elections Ontario

1943 Ontario general election
Party	Candidate	Votes	%	±%
Co-operative Commonwealth	Rae Luckock	4,681	38.56	+26.87
Progressive Conservative	Harold Menzies	4,395	36.21	–7.86
Liberal	Ernest Charlton Bogart	2,765	22.78	–21.46
Soldier	John Dymond	298	2.45	–
Total valid votes		12,139	98.73	
Total rejected ballots		156	1.27	–0.12
Turnout		12,295	49.55	–19.86
Eligible voters		24,813		
Co-operative Commonwealth gain from Liberal		Swing		+24.17
Source: Elections Ontario

1937 Ontario general election
Party	Candidate	Votes	%	±%
Liberal	Lionel Conacher	7,558	44.24	+4.99
Conservative	Arthur Russell Nesbitt	7,529	44.07	+2.97
Co-operative Commonwealth	Murray Cotterill	1,997	11.69	–5.72
Total valid votes		17,084	98.61	
Total rejected ballots		240	1.39	–0.00
Turnout		17,324	69.41	+4.56
Eligible voters		24,960		
Liberal gain from Conservative		Swing		+1.01
Source: Elections Ontario

1934 Ontario general election
Party	Candidate	Votes	%	±%
Conservative	Arthur Russell Nesbitt	6,452	41.10	–29.45
Liberal	Ernest Charlton Bogart	6,163	39.25	+11.90
Co-operative Commonwealth	Rose Henderson	2,734	17.41	–
Communist	Thomas Sims	312	1.99	–0.12
Socialist-Labour	William J. White	39	0.25	–
Total valid votes		15,700	98.61	
Total rejected ballots		221	1.39	+0.29
Turnout		15,921	64.84	+22.05
Eligible voters		24,553		
Conservative hold		Swing		–20.68
Source: Elections Ontario

1929 Ontario general election
Party	Candidate	Votes	%	±%
Conservative	Arthur Russell Nesbitt	7,108	70.54	+1.14
Liberal	Joseph John Noad	2,756	27.35	+16.49
Communist	Thomas Sims	212	2.10	–
Total valid votes		10,076	98.90	
Total rejected ballots		112	1.10	+1.01
Turnout		10,188	42.79	–27.54
Eligible voters		23,807		
Conservative hold		Swing		–7.68
Source: Elections Ontario

1926 Ontario general election
Party	Candidate	Votes	%
Conservative	Arthur Russell Nesbitt	10,563	69.41
Prohibitionist	Allan Wesley Pike	3,003	19.73
Liberal	Francis Hugh Wager	1,653	10.86
Total valid votes		15,219	99.91
Total rejected ballots		14	0.09
Turnout		15,233	70.33
Eligible voters		21,659	
Conservative pickup new district.			
Source: Elections Ontario

== See also ==
- List of Ontario provincial electoral districts
- Canadian provincial electoral districts
