= Edward Austin Horton =

Canadian politician (1907–1980)

1st Mayor of Etobicoke
- In office 1967–1972
- Preceded by: John MacBeth (as reeve)
- Succeeded by: Dennis Flynn

Personal details
- Born: June 1907 St. Thomas, Ontario
- Died: March 28, 1980 (aged 72)
- Spouse(s): Anne (died 1942), Marjory
- Children: 5
- Profession: civil servant, businessman

Edward Austin Horton (1907–1980) was the first Mayor of Etobicoke, Ontario (1967–1972). He was previously deputy minister of municipal affairs and public welfare in Ontario (1937–1941) and later a business owner.

After graduating from Harvard Business School with an MBA, he worked for Eastman Kodak in Rochester. He returned to Canada in 1935 to open a business handling claims from municipalities that had defaulted due to the Great Depression.

In 1936, Ontario Premier Mitch Hepburn appointed him as an inspector in the Municipal Affairs Branch before promoting him to deputy minister of municipal affairs and public welfare in 1937. In 1939, he was also appointed Director of Unemployment Relief while continuing as deputy minister of municipal affairs.

Horton left the provincial civil service in 1941 to join the federal government's Wartime Prices and Trade Board in Ottawa as director of the textiles division.

In 1944, he left government to open a business selling equipment to municipalities, selling the business to his employees in 1965 to take a volunteer position fundraising for Etobicoke General Hospital.

In 1952, he was elected deputy reeve of Etobicoke Township and was re-elected the next year. He did not stand for a third one-year term.

Horton returned to politics in 1966, running for Mayor of Etobicoke, his term beginning January 1967. He was the first mayor of the new borough of Etobicoke, created by the amalgamation of the former Township of Etobicoke with the Village of Long Branch, the Town of New Toronto, and the Town of Mimico. The new borough had a population of 250,000 and was one of six municipalities in Metropolitan Toronto.

He ran for re-election in 1969 and was almost defeated by Dennis Flynn following campaign where he accused Horton of supporting high rise development in the borough without consulting voters.

In November 1972, Horton announced that he would not run for a third term as mayor.

In the late 1970s, Horton was appointed to the Anti-Inflation Board by the federal government.
