= Doug Ford Sr. =

Canadian politician (1933-2006)

Member of the Ontario Provincial Parliament for Etobicoke—Humber
- In office June 8, 1995 – June 3, 1999
- Preceded by: Jim Henderson
- Succeeded by: Constituency abolished

Personal details
- Born: Douglas Bruce Ford; February 27, 1933 Toronto, Ontario, Canada
- Died: September 22, 2006 (aged 73) Toronto, Ontario, Canada
- Resting place: Riverside Cemetery
- Party: Progressive Conservative
- Spouse: Ruth Diane Campbell (m. 1956)
- Children: Kathy Stirpe (b. 1961); Randy Ford (b. 1962); Doug Ford Jr. (b. 1964); Rob Ford (1969–2016)
- Occupation: Businessman; politician

Douglas Bruce Ford Sr. (February 27, 1933 – September 22, 2006) was a Canadian businessman and politician for the province of Ontario. He was a Progressive Conservative member of the Legislative Assembly of Ontario from 1995 to 1999 who represented the riding of Etobicoke—Humber.

He was the father of former Toronto Mayor, Rob Ford, and the Premier of Ontario, Doug Ford.

== Background ==
Ford was born in 1933 in Toronto, the son of Celia (McNicol 1900–1973) and Ernest Ford (1889–1933), a Home Child, both immigrants from England. He grew up in the Danforth area of East York, Ontario. The youngest of nine children (brother Henry Edsel died at age 6 in 1935 and a sister died under age of 1 in 1923), he was raised by a single mother following his father's death in 1933. Ford was a businessman who, along with Ted Herriott, co-founded Deco Labels & Tags Limited of Rexdale, Ontario in 1962.

Ford and his wife, Diane, had four children: Kathy, Randy, Doug and Rob. Several of Ford's descendants went on to have careers in politics. Rob Ford served as Mayor of Toronto from 2010 to 2014, and also represented Ward 2 (Etobicoke North) on Toronto City Council from 2000 to 2010 and again from 2014 until his death in 2016. The older Doug represented Ward 2 on Toronto Council from 2010 to 2014 (while Rob was serving as Mayor), then later sought the mayoral chair himself in 2014 (finishing second to John Tory), and then was elected leader of the Progressive Conservative Party of Ontario in 2018. Subsequently, Doug led the Conservatives to a majority government in the 2018 Ontario general election. Ford's grandson, Michael Ford, was elected to the Ward 2 council seat following Rob Ford's death.

== Politics ==
Ford was elected to the provincial legislature in the 1995 provincial election, defeating incumbent Liberal Jim Henderson by about 4,500 votes in Etobicoke—Humber. For the next four years, he sat as a backbench supporter of Mike Harris's government.

In 1996, the Harris government reduced the number of provincial ridings from 130 to 103, a change which forced some sitting MPPs from the same party to fight one another for re-nomination. Ford challenged Chris Stockwell for the Progressive Conservative nomination in the newly created riding of Etobicoke Centre. Despite support from Jim Flaherty and others in cabinet, he was defeated.

== Later life ==
Ford retired from politics after his election defeat and returned to running his business. He died of colon cancer in 2006, only six weeks after his diagnosis. A park, formerly named Weston Wood Park, on Royal York Road was renamed Douglas B. Ford Park in 2010 in his honour. The small park has a playground and trees adjacent to Humber River. The Ford family is located very near to the park.

Ford is buried at Riverside Cemetery, which is near the park named in his honour.

His wife Diane Ruth Campbell died of cancer in January 2020.
