= Bev Lewis =

Canadian politician

Ontario MPP
- In office 1955–1967
- Preceded by: New riding
- Succeeded by: George Ben
- Constituency: Humber

27th Reeve of Etobicoke
- In office 1953–1956
- Preceded by: Clive M. Sinclair
- Succeeded by: Henry Oscar Waffle

Personal details
- Born: William Beverley Lewis; August 8, 1906 County of York
- Died: November 14, 1972 (aged 66)
- Party: Progressive Conservative
- Occupation: Business owner

William Beverley Lewis (August 8, 1906 – November 14, 1972) was a politician in Ontario, Canada. He was a Progressive Conservative member from 1955 to 1967 who represented the riding of Humber.

== Background ==
Lewis was born in the County of York to William Walter Lewis and Hannah Thornton, and grew up in Toronto where he attended Harbord Collegiate and Central Technical School. He married Gladys Edith Victoria Edgerley on July 17, 1926, at age 19. Lewis worked as a pressman for the Toronto Daily Star, The Globe, and the Toronto Telegram and was elected president of the Toronto local of the International Printing Pressmen and Assistants Union of North America, on three occasions. He later went into business selling construction supplies and as a land development consultant. In his youth, Lewis was the Ontario speed skating champion and played semi-pro baseball. In the 1950s, he led a campaign to build Etobicoke's first indoor public swimming pool.

Lewis owned a bowling alley in New Toronto and his daughter, Beryl, became a champion swimmer with the Lakeshore Swim Club.

== Politics ==
Lewis was elected as an Alderman in Etobicoke Township in 1951. He served as Reeve of the Township from 1953 to 1956. In 1953, the Province of Ontario passed legislation that created a new level of government to assume many of the functions previously administered by Cities and Townships surrounding the City of Toronto. The Municipality of Metropolitan Toronto, or "Metro" as it was colloquially known, had, as its Council, representatives from 14 communities, including Etobicoke Township, and, as a result, Lewis served as one of the founding members of Metro Council, from 1953 to 1956. As reeve in 1954, he organized relief efforts following Hurricane Hazel.

In 1955, Lewis ran for, and won, the nomination as the PC candidate for the newly created riding of Humber. At that time, it was possible to serve in more than one political office, in Ontario, and Lewis subsequently won in the 1955 provincial general election. He was re-elected in the general elections in 1959, and 1963, but he was defeated by the Liberal candidate, George Ben, in the 1967 general election.

Lewis served as a backbench member of a succession of PC majority governments led by Premiers Leslie Frost and then John Robarts. During his 12 years in the legislature he participated in various parliamentary committees dealing with energy and the environment.

After leaving provincial politics, Lewis moved to Mara Township on the shores of Lake Simcoe, where he had a cottage. He was elected reeve in 1969 and was successful in having a medical clinic and attracting a doctor to the community of 1,000. He was reeve when he died of a heart attack at 65.
