= Betty Kobayashi Issenman =

Canadian ethnologist (1921–2020)

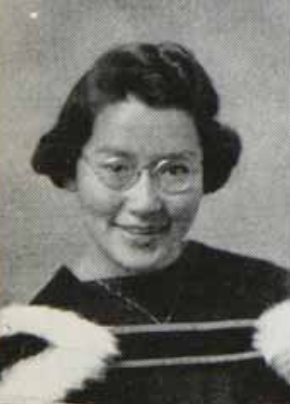
- Kobayashi in the 1940 yearbook of McGill University
- Born: 12 January 1921; Winnipeg, Manitoba, Canada
- Died: 10 March 2020 (aged 99); Bedford, Nova Scotia, Canada
- Occupation: Ethnologist
- Notable work: Sinews of Survival (1997)

Betty Kobayashi Issenman (12 January 1921 – 10 March 2020) was a Canadian ethnologist. As an independent researcher, she was an expert in Inuit clothing.

== Early life and education ==
Kobayashi was born in Winnipeg and raised in Montreal, the daughter of Mary Campbell Jamieson and Harry Shinsuke Kobayashi. Her ancestors were Scottish and Japanese. Her father served in the Canadian military during World War I, and was a close friend of the family of S. I. Hayakawa in Winnipeg. She spoke in favor of a boycott on Japanese goods as a delegate to the Canadian Youth Congress in 1938.

She graduated from McGill University in 1940, and from the Montreal School of Social Work in 1942. She earned a master's degree from the University of Montreal later in life. During World War II, her father's business was seized while he was in Japan, her brother served in the Royal Canadian Air Force, and she and her sister were fingerprinted by the Royal Canadian Mounted Police.

== Career ==
Issenman worked as a social worker and a costume designer. She volunteered at McCord Stewart Museum. She also held a pilot's license and was active in the Montreal chapter of the Ninety-Nines, an organization for women pilots. In 1955 she was one of the six members of the Congress of Canadian Women to visit China as a guest of the All-China Federation of Women.

Issenman's 1997 book, Sinews of Survival, was considered "a richly detailed account of Inuit culture as expressed through clothing." She was appointed as a member to the Order of Canada in 2002.

== Selected publications ==
- Sinews of Survival: The Living Legacy of Inuit Clothing (University of British Columbia Press, 1997: ISBN 978-0774805964)
- "Many Disciplines, Many Rewards: Inuit Clothing Research" (2014)

== Personal life ==
Kobayashi married fellow McGill alumnus Arnold Jacob Issenman in 1947, and had three daughters. Her husband died in 2010, and she died in 2020 in Bedford, Nova Scotia, at the age of 99.
