= Ministry of the Environment, Conservation and Parks =

Ontarian provincial government ministry

- Ministère de l’Environnement, de la Protection de la nature et des Parcs (French)
- Government of Ontario wordmark

Government ministry overview
- Formed: 1972
- Jurisdiction: Government of Ontario
- Headquarters: 2nd Floor, Macdonald Block, 900 Bay Street, Toronto, Ontario, M7A 1N3
- Employees: 2021
- Annual budget: $322 million
- Minister responsible: Todd McCarthy, Minister of the Environment, Conservation and Parks
- Website: www.ontario.ca/page/ministry-environment-conservation-parks

The Ministry of the Environment, Conservation and Parks is an Ontario government ministry responsible for protecting and improving the quality of the environment in the Canadian province of Ontario, as well as coordinating Ontario's actions on climate change. The ministry headquarters are located inside the Ontario Government Buildings.

== History ==
The Ministry of the Environment was originally established as a portfolio in the Executive Council of Ontario (or provincial cabinet) in 1972.

The ministry was merged with the Ministry of Energy to form the Ministry of Environment and Energy from 1993 to 1997, and briefly again in 2002, before being split back up again.

Following the 2014 Ontario election, the addition of climate change to the ministry's portfolio was announced on June 24, 2014, and its name changed from the Ministry of the Environment to the Ministry of the Environment and Climate Change.

Following the 2018 Ontario election, the Ministry's name was changed from the Ministry of the Environment and Climate Change to the Ministry of the Environment, Conservation and Parks on June 29, 2018.

== Responsibilities ==
=== Air quality ===
The MECP works to improve air quality through legislation, targeted programs, and partnership agreements with other neighbouring airsheds. This includes using a network of air quality stations that provide real-time air pollution data. The ministry communicates air quality to the public by providing an Air Quality Index based on ambient levels of ozone, fine particulate matter, nitrogen dioxide, carbon monoxide, sulphur dioxide, and total reduced sulphur compounds.

=== Brownfields ===
MECP is responsible for administering Ontario Regulation 153/04 which requires, under specific circumstances, a Record of Site Condition (RSC) to be submitted to the Ministry for acknowledgement. A RSC contains Environmental Site Assessments that ascertain the current condition of a site, including whether contamination exists on-site. The RSC is required when a property owner is choosing to change the property use from a less-sensitive to more-sensitive use (Example: Industrial Use to Residential Use) and is often required by the municipality's Chief Building Official before approval of a building permit.

=== Climate change ===
The ministry released a climate change action plan in 2007, setting greenhouse gas reduction targets for the province. It is the aim of the provincial government to reduce its emissions to:

- 6% below 1990 levels by 2014;
- 15% below 1990 levels by 2020; and
- 80% below 1990 levels by 2050.

The ministry released an update on its progress towards these targets in 2014, indicating that it had surpassed its 2014 target. It also indicated that current trends and policies would result in 170 megatonnes of emissions, or 69% of its 2020 target.

In 2011, the ministry published Climate Ready, its first climate change adaptation strategy and action plan for 2011 to 2014. The report acknowledges that Ontario has experienced a 1.4°C increase in average temperatures, and that the province is suffering from more frequent extreme weather events including prolonged heat waves, torrential rain and wind storms, and drought. The report outlines how the province should prepare for and minimize the negative impacts of a changing climate, as well as strategies to reduce greenhouse gas emissions.

Under Ontario Regulation 452/09, any facility in Ontario that emits more than 25,000 tonnes of greenhouse gases annually is required to report their emissions. The reports must be verified by an accredited third party, to ensure it meets the requirements of ISO 14064-3. Reports are then submitted through Environment Canada's single window system.

A cap and trade program was implemented on January 1, 2017, which projected to cost the average Ontario household about $13 more per month to fuel a car and heat a home in 2017. By 2017 year end, the cap and trade program brought in nearly $2 billion in revenue. After Progressive Conservative Premier Doug Ford was sworn into office on June 29, 2018, he revoked Ontario's cap and trade program on July 3, 2018.

=== Drinking water ===
Ontario municipalities have responsibility for building and maintaining drinking water systems, but the ministry regulates these systems to achieve acceptable standards in water quality and safety.

=== Ontario Parks ===
Since its integration into the Ministry of the Environment, Conservation and Parks (MECP), Ontario Parks has become part of a broader provincial mandate focused on environmental protection, conservation, and climate resilience. The agency continues to manage over 340 provincial parks and conservation reserves, now under MECP's oversight, which emphasizes ecological integrity, biodiversity, and sustainable recreation. In recent years, Ontario Parks has seen significant expansions, including the addition of 19 protected areas in 2025, and a historic investment of nearly $60 million to build and upgrade over 1,000 campsites across the province, marking the largest expansion in 50 years. The ministry replaced the Class Environmental Assessment process with a streamlined Project Evaluation Policy to better align with MECP's regulatory framework. Ontario Parks operates under a Special Purpose Account and is guided by the Ontario Parks Board of Directors, which advises on strategic planning and long-term conservation goals.

=== Ontario Provincial Conservation Authority ===
In October 2025, the Ontario government created the Ontario Provincial Conservation Authority to oversee the 36 conservation authorities in the province, and to merge them into seven, through the Conservation Authorities Act. After public consultation, this number increased to nine in March 2026, with implementation to take place in May.

=== Other ===
- Environmental assessments
- Environmental approvals
- Environmental registry
- Environment maps
- Great Lakes and Watersheds
- Pesticides

== List of ministers ==
Name	Term of office		Tenure	Political party (Ministry)	Note
Minister of the Environment				PC (Davis)	
George Kerr	July 23, 1971	February 2, 1972	194 days (first instance)	PC (Davis)	
James Auld	February 2, 1972	February 26, 1974	2 years, 24 days	PC (Davis)	
Bill Newman	February 26, 1974	October 7, 1975	1 year, 223 days	PC (Davis)	
George Kerr	October 7, 1975	January 21, 1978	2 years, 106 days (second instance) (2 years, 300 days in total)	PC (Davis)	
George R. McCague	January 21, 1978	August 18, 1978	209 days	PC (Davis)	
Harry Craig Parrott	August 18, 1978	April 10, 1981	2 years, 235 days	PC (Davis)	
Keith Norton	April 10, 1981	July 6, 1983	2 years, 87 days	PC (Davis)	
Andy Brandt	July 6, 1983	February 8, 1985	1 year, 217 days	PC (Davis)	
Morley Kells	February 8, 1985	May 17, 1985	98 days	PC (Miller)	
Susan Fish	May 17, 1985	June 26, 1985	40 days	PC (Miller)	
Jim Bradley	June 26, 1985	October 1, 1990	5 years, 97 days (first instance)	Liberal (Peterson)	Served in same role under three different Premiers.
Ruth Grier	October 1, 1990	February 3, 1993	2 years, 125 days	NDP (Rae)	
Minister of Environment and Energy				NDP (Rae)	
Bud Wildman	February 3, 1993	June 26, 1995	2 years, 143 days	NDP (Rae)	
Brenda Elliott	June 26, 1995	August 16, 1996	1 year, 51 days	PC (Harris)	
Norm Sterling	August 16, 1996	October 10, 1997	to be continued	PC (Harris)	
Minister of the Environment				PC (Harris)	
Norm Sterling	October 10, 1997	June 17, 1999	2 years, 305 days	PC (Harris)	
Tony Clement	June 17, 1999	March 3, 2000	260 days	PC (Harris)	
Dan Newman	March 3, 2000	February 7, 2001	341 days	PC (Harris)	
Elizabeth Witmer	February 8, 2001	April 14, 2002	1 year, 65 days	PC (Harris)	
Minister of Environment and Energy				PC (Eves)	
Chris Stockwell	April 15, 2002	August 22, 2002	to be continued	PC (Eves)	
Minister of the Environment				PC (Eves)	
Chris Stockwell	August 22, 2002	June 17, 2003	1 year, 63 days	PC (Eves)	
Jim Wilson	June 17, 2003	October 22, 2003	127 days	PC (Eves)	
Leona Dombrowsky	October 23, 2003	June 29, 2005	1 year, 249 days	Liberal (McGuinty)	
Laurel Broten	June 29, 2005	October 30, 2007	2 years, 123 days	Liberal (McGuinty)	
John Gerretsen	October 30, 2007	August 18, 2010	2 years, 292 days	Liberal (McGuinty)	
John Wilkinson	August 18, 2010	October 20, 2011	1 year, 63 days	Liberal (McGuinty)	
Jim Bradley	October 20, 2011	February 11, 2013	2 years, 247 days (second instance); 7 years, 344 days in total	Liberal (McGuinty)	Served in same role under three different Premiers.
Jim Bradley	February 11, 2013	June 24, 2014	2 years, 247 days (second instance); 7 years, 344 days in total	Liberal (Wynne)	Served in same role under three different Premiers.
Minister of the Environment and Climate Change				Liberal (Wynne)	
Glen Murray	June 24, 2014	July 31, 2017	3 years, 37 days	Liberal (Wynne)	Resigned and retired from politics.
Chris Ballard	July 31, 2017	June 29, 2018	333 days	Liberal (Wynne)	
Minister of the Environment, Conservation and Parks				PC (Ford)	
Rod Phillips	June 29, 2018	June 20, 2019	356 days	PC (Ford)	
Jeff Yurek	June 20, 2019	June 18, 2021	1 year, 363 days	PC (Ford)	
David Piccini	June 18, 2021	September 22, 2023	2 years, 96 days	PC (Ford)	
Andrea Khanjin	September 22, 2023	March 19, 2025	1 year, 178 days	PC (Ford)	
Todd McCarthy	March 19, 2025	Present	1 year, 248 days	PC (Ford)	

== See also ==
- Government of Ontario
- Ontario's Drive Clean - defunct program
- Hydro One - formerly part of Ontario Hydro
- Ontario Power Generation - formerly part of Ontario Hydro
- Flick Off
