= John Palmer MacBeth =

Canadian politician

John MacBeth

Ontario MPP
- In office 1975–1981
- Preceded by: Nick Leluk
- Succeeded by: Morley Kells
- Constituency: Humber
- In office 1971–1975
- Preceded by: Leslie Rowntree
- Succeeded by: Nick Leluk
- Constituency: York West

29th Reeve of Etobicoke
- In office 1963–1966
- Preceded by: Henry Oscar Waffle
- Succeeded by: Edward Austin Horton (as mayor)

Personal details
- Born: John Palmer MacBeth; November 19, 1921 Toronto, Ontario, Canada
- Died: March 20, 1991 (aged 69) Tulsa, Oklahoma, US
- Party: Progressive Conservative
- Spouse: Ruth Eileen Stevens
- Children: 3: John, Wendy and Nancy
- Profession: Lawyer

Military service
- Allegiance: Canada
- Branch/service: Royal Canadian Navy
- Years of service: 1943–45
- Rank: Petty Officer
- Battles/wars: Battle of the Atlantic

John Palmer MacBeth (November 19, 1921 – March 20, 1991) was a politician in Ontario, Canada. He was a Progressive Conservative member of the Legislative Assembly of Ontario from 1975 to 1981. He represented the ridings of York West and Humber in the west end of Toronto. He served as a cabinet minister in the government of Bill Davis.

== Background ==
MacBeth was born in Toronto, the son of John Charles McKay MacBeth and Virginia Maria Palmer. MacBeth served in the Royal Canadian Navy during World War II from 1943 to 1945 on the corvette 'Orangeville' and attained the rank of Petty Officer. After the war he studied as a lawyer and graduated from Osgoode Hall Law School in 1948. He worked with his father. Their law firm became MacBeth and MacBeth. Later he practiced with a friend from kindergarten Douglas Swinarton Johnson as the law firm MacBeth and Johnson. His other lifelong friend, Andrew Leroy or uncle Wump, was also from kindergarten. He and his wife Ruth raised three children, John, Wendy and Nancy. He enjoyed clothes, cheap cigars and making fires. For years he and Ruth made their own Christmas cards, some needed a box for mailing. Fascinated as a boy by 'Mutiny on the Bounty', late in life he saw Pitcairn Island. Every day he read from the Bible. The kilt of his ancestors who came to the Red River settlement in 1812 was worn for Christmas family gatherings.

Community involvement ranged from the Kiwanis club of the Kingsway, to Masons lodge 655, to president of the Ontario Cancer Society.

== Politics ==
He was the last reeve of Etobicoke from 1963 to 1966 and was also chairman of the Etobicoke board of education. He had served on the Etobicoke Hydro commission as well.

In the 1971 provincial election he ran as the Progressive Conservative candidate in the riding of York West. He defeated Liberal candidate Dave Rattray by 14,180 votes. He was re-elected in 1975 in the riding of Humber defeating Liberal candidate Alex Marchetti. He was re-elected in 1977.

MacBeth was appointed to cabinet On June 1, 1974 as Minister of Labour to replace Fern Guindon who was seeking Federal office. In October 1975 he was promoted to Provincial Secretary for Justice and Solicitor General. In 1977, he briefly held the position of Minister of Correctional Services after Arthur Meen retired from office.

MacBeth said that one of his best accomplishments was passing a Sunday closing law in Ontario. He said, "I still get letters from people who are thankful that they do not have to work on those days." The legislation proved to be unwieldy and was eventually repealed in 1992. He retired from politics in 1981.

=== Cabinet positions ===
Davis ministry, Province of Ontario (1971–1985)
Cabinet posts (4)
Predecessor	Office	Successor
Arthur Meen	Minister of Correctional Services; 1977 (June–September)	Frank Drea
John Clement	Solicitor General; 1975–1978	George Kerr
John Clement	Provincial Secretary for Justice; 1975–1978	Gordon Walker
Fernand Guindon	Minister of Labour; 1974–1975	Bette Stephenson

== Later life ==
After retiring from politics, he was appointed vice-chairman of the Ontario Police Commission which he held until 1987. He died while vacationing in Tulsa, Oklahoma after achieving a life goal to see all 50 states (Texas was the last) and is buried by his parents and youngest daughter with his wife at Park Lawn Cemetery in Etobicoke.
