= Sinews of Survival =

1997 ethnographic book by Betty Kobayashi Issenman

- Author: Betty Kobayashi Issenman
- Language: English
- Subject: Inuit clothing
- Published: 1997 (University of British Columbia Press)
- Publication place: Canada
- Media type: Print (Hardcover)
- Pages: 274
- ISBN: 978-0774805964

Sinews of Survival: The Living Legacy of Inuit Clothing is a 1997 ethnographic book about Inuit clothing by Canadian ethnologist Betty Kobayashi Issenman. The book draws from existing research as well as Issenman's own travels and research with Inuit seamstresses. Sinews of Survival is illustrated with maps, clothing patterns, and color photographs of numerous clothing items.

== Summary ==
The first chapters of the book discuss the history of Inuit clothing as it developed through the prehistoric, historic, and modern eras, covering the materials, tools, and processes that have traditionally been used to make these garments. Early European research on Inuit clothing is also explored. The bulk of the book covers the distinct styles of each of ten Canadian Inuit subgroups: the Inuvialuit, Copper Inuit, Netsilik, Iglulingmiut, Sallirmiut, Caribou Inuit, Nunatsiarmiut or Baffin Island Inuit, Nunavimiut or Ungava Peninsula Inuit, Qikirtamiut or Belcher Islands Inuit, and the Inuit of Nunatsiavut in Labrador. Although focused on Canadian Inuit in particular, the book also provides a brief introduction to the clothing of other circumpolar peoples, including the Greenlandic Inuit, Alaskan Iñupiaq and Yup'ik, and the indigenous peoples of Siberia, due to shared traits in their respective clothing. The remainder of the text discusses the aesthetic design and spiritual elements of Inuit clothing and explores areas for future research.

== Reception ==
Sinews of Survival was positively received by academics. Archaeologist Charles D. Arnold described it in Arctic as "a delight to read," specifically citing the layout and use of illustrations as a positive, and noted that it was "the most comprehensive yet available" on the topic. In his review for Anthropologica, anthropologist Gérald Baril stated that it "will now be a cardinal reference in the field." In American Indian Quarterly, historian Carolyn O'Bagy Davis wrote that Sinews of Survival "is a beautiful and exhaustive documentation that will be a valuable resource." For Choice Reviews, B.B. Chico highlighted the "extensive bibliography and useful glossary."

The book was also well-received by lay critics. Paul Waters of the Montreal Gazette wrote that the book was "richly detailed" but found it too academic for most lay readers. Robin McGrath of The Telegram wrote that there is "a great deal here to interest lovers of art and fashion." In 2004, Michelle Paver, an author of historical fiction, named Sinews of Survival as one of her favorite anthropology books.

Sinews of Survival won the 1998 Millia Davenport Award from the American Costume Society and the Alcuin Society Award for Excellence in Book Design. Issenman was appointed a Member of the Order of Canada in 2002 for her research on Inuit clothing, including her work on Sinews of Survival.
