= Henry Oscar Waffle =

Canadian politician

28th Reeve of Etobicoke
- In office 1957–1962
- Preceded by: Bev Lewis
- Succeeded by: John MacBeth

Personal details
- Born: 1918
- Died: March 7, 1980 (aged 61–62) Etobicoke
- Spouse: Evelyn Hannah Waffle
- Children: 3
- Profession: Automotive dealer

Henry Oscar Waffle (1918 — March 7, 1980) was a Canadian politician who was reeve of Etobicoke, Ontario from 1957 to 1962. While reeve he advocated for the construction of monorails and was accused of conflict of interest after the city purchased dump trucks from his dealership. In 1973, he filed a lawsuit alleging Dennis Flynn could not be elected mayor of Etobicoke because he worked for the city of Toronto, causing a new election to be held. He died in 1980.

== Early life and career ==
During World War II, Waffle had been a fighter pilot in the Royal Canadian Air Force.

Waffle owned a small garage before becoming a founding partner of Islington Ford in 1946, a large Ford dealership in Toronto that later became Thorncliffe Motors.

During the flooding that resulted from Hurricane Hazel in 1954, Waffle organized a shortwave radio communications hub to help obtain and distribute clothing, food supplies and fuel for afflicted neighbourhoods in Etobicoke. As part of the relief efforts, Waffle also helped provide emergency heating for the local children's hospital and used his position as an auto dealer to arrange a truck convoy system for emergency supplies.

== Municipal politics ==
Waffle was elected deputy reeve in 1954 for a two-year term before being elected reeve in the December 1956 municipal election, taking office in January 1957.

He urged the merger of the Township of Etobicoke with the small municipalities of New Toronto, Mimico, and Long Branch. He called the formation of Metropolitan Toronto in 1953 "the greatest single thing that happened" in the area.

Waffle was criticized for remaining a director of his car dealership during his tenure as reeve. He was accused of being in a conflict of interest because the township purchased nine dump trucks at a cost of $25,000 from Waffle's dealership while he was reeve. The township solicitor ruled that there was no conflict of interest since, as reeve, Waffle did not vote on the contract as reeves only voted to break a tie, and there was none in that vote. Waffle was a member of Metropolitan Toronto Council in 1961 when his car dealership successfully bid to sell the Metropolitan Toronto Police 95 cars.

Waffle opposed the construction of the Bloor–Danforth subway and advocated for constructing a monorail linking Etobicoke with the rest of Toronto.

Waffle did not run in the 1962 municipal election and left office.

== Post-municipal politics ==
In 1973, Waffle obtained a court order unseating newly elected Etobicoke mayor Dennis Flynn, disqualifying him from being elected mayor as he was a city of Toronto employee during the 1972 election, contrary to the Municipal Elections Act. A new election was ordered and Flynn won with a larger majority.

It was speculated in The Globe and Mail that he was acting on behalf of Etobicoke's political establishment, which Flynn had challenged when he ran against and almost defeated Horton in the 1969 election.

At the height of the Cold War, Waffle was chairman of the Metropolitan Civil Defence Organization, and its successor, the Metro Emergency Measures Organization, responsible for encouraging residents to build fallout shelters in their backyards and basements.

== Personal life and death ==
Waffle and his wife, Evelyn (née Hannah), had three children: Dawn, Alan, and Paul. He suffered from a muscular disease for several years before his death in 1980, aged 61 or 62.
