= Bruce Sinclair (politician) =

Canadian politician (1928–2023)

Toronto City Councillor for Rexdale (Thistletown)
- In office 1997–2000
- Preceded by: New riding
- Succeeded by: Riding abolished

3rd Mayor of Etobicoke
- In office 1984–1994
- Preceded by: Dennis Flynn
- Succeeded by: Doug Holyday

Etobicoke Controller
- In office 1973–1984

Alderman for Ward 3 Etobicoke Council
- In office 1969–1972

Personal details
- Born: G. Bruce Sinclair; June 20, 1928
- Died: March 24, 2023 (aged 94) Toronto, Ontario, Canada
- Occupation: Teacher

G. Bruce Sinclair (June 20, 1928 – March 24, 2023) was a Canadian politician in Toronto, Ontario. He served as mayor of Etobicoke from 1984 until 1993 when he was defeated by Doug Holyday. Before becoming mayor, he served 15 years on Etobicoke's council as alderman and controller. From 1998 to 2000 he was a member of Toronto City Council, but was defeated in the 2000 Toronto municipal election.

Sinclair was first elected to Etobicoke Council as alderman for Ward 3 in 1969, defeating incumbent Alec McNeil in a recount. In the 1972 election, he was elected to the borough's Board of Control, which also gave him a seat on Metro Toronto Council. He remained on the Board of Control until 1984 when he was chosen mayor by Etobicoke council, to fill a vacancy caused when incumbent mayor Dennis Flynn stepped down upon being elected Metro Toronto Chairman.

Before public office, Sinclair worked for Bell Gouinlock (Securities) Limited and Etobicoke Board of Education (as a math teacher, counsellor and consultant). In his first few months as mayor, Sinclair continued to operate a consulting business he had run for several years, giving advice to Ontario municipalities on debenture financing, leading to criticism from other members of council.

Sinclair died on March 24, 2023, at the age of 94.
