= Jim Henderson (Ontario politician) =

Canadian politician (1940–2020)

Ontario MPP
- In office 1987–1995
- Preceded by: New riding
- Succeeded by: Doug Ford Sr.
- Constituency: Etobicoke—Humber
- In office 1985–1987
- Preceded by: Morley Kells
- Succeeded by: Riding abolished
- Constituency: Humber

Personal details
- Born: Donald James Henderson; August 7, 1940 Sudbury, Ontario, Canada
- Died: May 2, 2020 (aged 79) Toronto, Ontario, Canada
- Party: Liberal
- Occupation: Physician

Donald James Henderson (August 7, 1940 – May 2, 2020) was a Canadian politician, who served as a Liberal member of the Legislative Assembly of Ontario from 1985 to 1995. He represented the ridings of Humber and Etobicoke—Humber.

== Background ==
Henderson was educated at the University of Toronto, the University of Western Ontario, Johns Hopkins University, the Royal College of Physicians and Surgeons of Canada, and the American Board of Psychiatry and Neurology. He worked as a physician, psychiatrist, psychoanalyst, Director of Psychiatry at the Lakeshore Psychiatric Hospital in Toronto and the Royal Victoria Hospital in Barrie before entering political life, and served as an associate professor in the Department of Psychiatry, and Psychiatrist in Chief for the Student Health Services, at the University of Toronto.

== Politics ==
He was elected to the Ontario legislature in the provincial election of 1985, defeating Progressive Conservative incumbent Morley Kells by about 2,000 votes in the Toronto constituency of Humber. The Liberal Party formed a minority government after this election. Henderson states that his decision to enter politics was as simple as stepping off the street car and saying "I want to be a candidate" at the Liberal constituency office for the riding.

Initially Henderson was named as the parliamentary assistant (PA) for the Ministry of Community and Social Services. In 1986, Henderson took a highly public stance against the Liberal government in its attempt to ban extra-billing by doctors, a practice by which physicians bill patients directly an amount in addition to what is provided by the provincial health plan, and was generally supportive of doctors in their illegal strike that followed. Consequently, he fell into disfavour with the premier David Peterson, and was generally regarded as being on the political right of the Liberal Party.

He was later appointed as PA for the Ministry of Colleges and Universities. In the 1987 provincial election he was re-elected by an increased margin in the redistributed riding of Etobicoke—Humber. He again served as a PA to the Ministry of Colleges and Universities, before being appointed as PA for a minister without portfolio responsible for the province's Anti-Drug Strategy.

The Liberals were upset by the New Democratic Party in the 1990 provincial election, although Henderson managed to defeat his NDP opponent by about 3,500 votes. He served as his party's critic for Culture and Communications in the parliament which followed.

The Progressive Conservatives won a majority government in the 1995 provincial election, and Henderson was defeated by PC challenger Doug Ford, Sr. (the father of Toronto city councillor Rob Ford).

While a private member of the legislature, Henderson brought forward a private member's bills on several topics. One such bill, Bill 95, which received first reading in 1988, would have amended the Children's Law Reform Act, to create a presumption of joint custody for parents in the event of a divorce, absent evidence of harm to the children, and required mandatory mediation of custody disputes. In another, which received first reading in 1987, would have allowed individuals to request anonymous HIV testing by amending the mandatory reporting requirements in the Health Protection and Promotion Act. He also proposed a private member's bill to give members greater freedom to take positions consistent with their constituent's views and individual perspective. In 1997, he wrote favourably in The Globe and Mail of a meeting he had had with Fidel Castro several years earlier.

After politics, he returned to the practice of psychoanalysis in the City of Toronto until 2011. He died on May 2, 2020, from complications from Parkinson's disease and COVID-19 during the COVID-19 pandemic in Canada.
