= Nick Leluk =

Canadian politician

Ontario MPP
- In office 1975–1987
- Preceded by: John Palmer MacBeth
- Succeeded by: Riding abolished
- Constituency: York West
- In office 1971–1975
- Preceded by: George Ben
- Succeeded by: John Palmer MacBeth
- Constituency: Humber

Personal details
- Born: February 23, 1935 Hillcrest, Alberta
- Died: February 9, 1998 (aged 62)
- Party: Progressive Conservative
- Occupation: Pharmacist

Nicholas George Leluk (February 23, 1935 – February 9, 1998) was a politician in Ontario, Canada. He served in the Legislative Assembly of Ontario from 1971 to 1987, and was a cabinet minister in the Progressive Conservative governments of Bill Davis and Frank Miller.

== Background ==
Leluk was born in Hillcrest, Alberta, and educated at the University of Toronto and the University of Wisconsin–Madison. He worked as a pharmacist, and was executive assistant to the registrar of the Ontario College of Pharmacists from 1961 to 1969. Leluk was both a freemason and a Knight of Malta. He also served as President of the Ontario Tae Kwon-Do Association from 1974 to 1983, and was a founding executive director of the Council on Drug Abuse.

== Politics ==
Leluk was elected to the Ontario legislature in the 1971 provincial election, in the Etobicoke constituency of Humber. He was re-elected for York West in the elections of 1975, 1977, and 1981. He was named Minister of Correctional Services in Bill Davis's government on April 10, 1981. Leluk supported Frank Miller to succeed Davis in January 1985, and was retained in his portfolio when Miller became Premier of Ontario on February 8, 1985.

He was narrowly re-elected in the 1985 provincial election, defeating Liberal candidate Leonard Braithwaite by 715 votes. The Progressive Conservatives were reduced to a tenuous minority government in this election. Leluk was named Minister of Citizenship and Culture on May 17, 1985, but accomplished little in this position before the Miller government was defeated by a motion of non-confidence in June 1985.

Leluk served as an opposition member for two years, and did not run for re-election in 1987. He died in 1998.

=== Cabinet positions ===
Miller ministry, Province of Ontario (1985)
Cabinet post (1)
Predecessor	Office	Successor
Susan Fish	Minister of Citizenship and Culture; 1985 (May–June)	Lily Munro
Davis ministry, Province of Ontario (1971–1985)
Cabinet post (1)
Predecessor	Office	Successor
Gordon Walker	Minister of Correctional Services; 1981–1985	Don Cousens
