= Dennis Flynn (Canadian politician) =

Canadian politician (1923–2003)

Etobicoke Councillor for Kingsway-Humber
- In office 1988–1997
- Succeeded by: Position abolished

5th Metro Toronto Chairman
- In office 1984–1987
- Preceded by: Paul Godfrey
- Succeeded by: Alan Tonks

2nd Mayor of Etobicoke
- In office 1972–1984
- Preceded by: Edward Austin Horton
- Succeeded by: Bruce Sinclair

Personal details
- Born: Denis Christopher Flynn; December 17, 1923 Rathcormac, County Cork, Ireland
- Died: August 19, 2003 (aged 79) Pembroke, Ontario

Christopher Dennis Flynn (according to Irish Civic Birth Registration, his name was Denis Christopher O'Flynn at birth) O.Ont, (December 17, 1923 – August 19, 2003) was Chairman of Metropolitan Toronto from 1984 to 1988. Flynn rarely used his first name and was commonly known as Dennis Flynn.

== Background ==
Born in Rathcormac, County Cork, Ireland to the O'Flynn family, the family immigrated to Canada while he was a child. He had two brothers Patrick and John, and two sisters, Eileen and Mary. Eventually the family dropped the O honorific and became known simply as Flynn. Flynn's older brother Patrick Flynn was a Member of Parliament from 1974 to 1979. His sister Eileen married Eugene Natale and the two of them went into the clothing business. His sister Mary worked for the City of Toronto and is the widow of Ron Ross, a successful high school teacher. His brother John had a career in Leadership Development and married Joselyn Leise a school teacher. Dennis married Margaret (née Courtney) and they had seven children.

He enlisted in the Toronto Scottish Regiment in 1938 and was in the 1st Canadian Parachute Battalion in World War II. He saw action during the D-Day landings and was wounded twice. He walked with a limp due to these injuries. He attended the University of Toronto in 1947. After graduating, he joined the City of Toronto's clerk's department and rose to the position of protocol officer (public relations director).

In 2003, Flynn's son, Tim, ran unsuccessfully in Ward 25 (Don Valley West) for a seat on Toronto City Council.

== Politics ==
He was unsuccessful in his first attempt to be elected mayor of Etobicoke in 1969, but succeeded in 1972. However, following a complaint by former Etobicoke reeve Henry Oscar Waffle, he was disqualified by a county court judge after the fact for having been an employee of the City of Toronto on nomination and election day. Flynn, having resigned his Toronto position, won again in the mayoral by-election held March 12, 1973, defeating his only opponent by a 10:1 margin.

Flynn was mayor of Etobicoke until 1984 when he succeeded Paul Godfrey as Metro Chairman. He held that position until 1988. In 1988, Alan Tonks contested Flynn's position and defeated him in a vote held by Metro Council to become Metro Chairman. In the 1988 municipal election, he ran successfully for Metro Council in the ward of Kingsway-Humber ward. Flynn remained as Metro Councillor until 1997. He ran for a seat on the newly amalgamated Toronto City Council in 1997, but finished third behind Gloria Lindsay Luby and Mario Giansante.

== Later life ==
In 2001, he was awarded the Order of Ontario for his distinguished record of public service.

Flynn was the Honorary Lieutenant-Colonel of the Toronto Scottish Regiment (Queen Elizabeth The Queen Mother's Own). In 2003, while visiting the regiment at CFB Petawawa in Pembroke, Ontario, he suffered a heart attack and died. He was 79.
