= Congress of Canadian Women =

Canadian feminist organization

The Congress of Canadian Women (French: Congrès des femmes canadiennes) was a feminist organization created in March 1950 by the merger of several organizations, including the Housewives and Consumers Association. It was affiliated with the Women's International Democratic Federation. The Congress lobbied for women's equality including measures such as equal pay and public daycare. Rae Luckock was the organization's founding president. Former Labor-Progressive Party Member of Parliament Dorise Nielsen was also involved in founding the organization. The CCW was largely led by women associated with the communist Labor-Progressive Party and was also involved with the peace movement during the Cold War, facilitating meetings between people from the Soviet Union and Canadians, by inviting them to visit Canada.

There is a file of papers related to the Congress of Canadian Women in the Canadian Women's Movement Archive at the University of Ottawa Library. The Diefenbunker Museum in Ontario holds a peace campaign pin produced in the 1950s by the Congress of Canadian Women.

== Notable members ==
- Rae Luckock
- Dorise Nielsen
- Nora Rodd
