= Harry Hyland Hyndman =

Canadian politician (1920–1963)

Harry Harland Hyndman (January 31, 1920 – August 28, 1963) was a politician in Ontario, Canada. He represented Bracondale in the Legislative Assembly of Ontario from 1945 to 1948 as a Progressive Conservative.

The son of Henry Harland Hyndman, a lawyer, he was born in Edmonton, Alberta and was educated at Osgoode Hall Law School. He was a nephew of Alberta lawyer, judge and politician James Hyndman. Hyndman was a lieutenant in the Royal Canadian Navy, who served during World War II and retired in 1945.

After leaving politics, he worked as a journalist for the Oshawa Times. Hyndman died suddenly in Montreal at the age of 43.
