= Humber (provincial electoral district) =

Former provincial electoral district in Ontario, Canada

York—Humber (1955–1963) Humber (1963–1987) Etobicoke—Humber (1987–1999)
Ontario electoral district

Defunct provincial electoral district
- Legislature: Legislative Assembly of Ontario
- District created: 1955
- District abolished: 1996
- First contested: 1955
- Last contested: 1995

Demographics
- Census division: Toronto
- Census subdivision: Toronto

Humber was a provincial electoral district (riding) in Ontario, Canada. It was created prior to the 1955 provincial election from parts of the York West and York South ridings. It was eliminated in 1996, when most of its territory was incorporated into the ridings of Etobicoke Centre and Etobicoke—Lakeshore. Humber was located in the municipalities of York, Toronto, and Etobicoke.

The riding went through two name changes and several boundary changes during its lifetime. From 1955 to 1963 it was known as York—Humber and existed mostly on the east side of the Humber River. From 1963 to 1987 it was known as Humber, and in 1987 it was changed to Etobicoke-Humber. From 1963 onwards it was mostly on the west side of the river.

== Members of Provincial Parliament ==
Assembly	Years	Member	Party
Created from York West and York South ridings in 1955
York—Humber
25th	1955–1959	Bev Lewis	Progressive Conservative
26th	1959–1963	Bev Lewis	Progressive Conservative
Humber
27th	1963–1967	Bev Lewis	Progressive Conservative
28th	1967–1971	George Ben	Liberal
29th	1971–1975	Nick Leluk	Progressive Conservative
30th	1975–1977	John MacBeth	Progressive Conservative
31st	1977–1981	John MacBeth	Progressive Conservative
32nd	1981–1985	Morley Kells	Progressive Conservative
33rd	1985–1987	Jim Henderson	Liberal
Etobicoke—Humber
34th	1987–1990	Jim Henderson	Liberal
35th	1990–1995	Jim Henderson	Liberal
36th	1995–1999	Doug Ford Sr.	Progressive Conservative
Sourced from the Ontario Legislative Assembly
Merged into Etobicoke Centre and Etobicoke—Lakeshore ridings after 1996

== Election results ==
=== Etobicoke—Humber (1987–1999) ===
1995 Ontario general election: Etobicoke—Humber
Party	Candidate	Votes	%	±%
Progressive Conservative	Doug Ford Sr.	18,128	51.26	+24.85
Liberal	Jim Henderson	13,634	38.55	–0.06
New Democratic	Osman A. Ali	3,100	8.77	–19.80
Independent	Omar Mohamed	257	0.73	–
Natural Law	Lawrence Staranchuk	196	0.55	–
Independent	Mohamoud D. Sheik-Nor	51	0.14	–
Total valid votes		35,366	98.99	
Total rejected, unmarked and declined ballots		361	1.01	–0.53
Turnout		35,727	73.35	+3.05
Eligible voters		48,708		
Progressive Conservative gain from Liberal		Swing		+22.33
Source: Elections Ontario

1990 Ontario general election: Etobicoke—Humber
Party	Candidate	Votes	%	±%
Liberal	Jim Henderson	13,582	38.61	–22.44
New Democratic	Russ Springate	10,049	28.57	+15.84
Progressive Conservative	Aileen Anderson	9,289	26.41	+3.67
Family Coalition	Tony Dodds	1,292	3.67	+0.18
Green	David Moore	586	1.67	–
Libertarian	Alan D'Orsay	380	1.08	–
Total valid votes		35,178	98.46	
Total rejected, unmarked and declined ballots		552	1.54	+1.03
Turnout		35,730	70.29	+3.84
Eligible voters		50,829		
Liberal hold		Swing		–19.14
Source: Elections Ontario

1987 Ontario general election: Etobicoke—Humber
Party	Candidate	Votes	%	±%
Liberal	Jim Henderson	21,644	61.05	–
Progressive Conservative	Avie Flaherty	8,062	22.74	–
New Democratic	Peter Sutherland	4,511	12.72	–
Family Coalition	George C. Hartwell	1,237	3.49	–
Total valid votes		35,454	99.49	
Total rejected ballots		183	0.51	–
Turnout		35,637	66.45	–
Eligible voters		53,627		
Liberal notional hold		Swing		–
Source: Elections Ontario

=== Humber (1963–1987) ===
1985 Ontario general election
Party	Candidate	Votes	%	±%
Liberal	Jim Henderson	18,057	45.92	+16.74
Progressive Conservative	Morley Kells	16,106	40.96	–19.47
New Democratic	Peter Sutherland	5,160	13.12	+2.73
Total valid votes		39,323	99.35	
Total rejected ballots		258	0.65	–0.07
Turnout		39,581	66.69	+7.01
Eligible voters		59,348		
Liberal gain from Progressive Conservative		Swing		+18.11
Source: Elections Ontario

1981 Ontario general election
Party	Candidate	Votes	%	±%
Progressive Conservative	Morley Kells	20,844	60.43	+9.48
Liberal	Jim Mills	10,064	29.18	+2.09
New Democratic	Jacquie Chic	3,583	10.39	–9.55
Total valid votes		34,491	99.28	
Total rejected ballots		251	0.72	+0.28
Turnout		34,742	59.68	–9.27
Eligible voters		58,213		
Progressive Conservative hold		Swing		+3.69
Source: Elections Ontario

1977 Ontario general election
Party	Candidate	Votes	%	±%
Progressive Conservative	John Palmer MacBeth	19,888	50.95	+6.44
Liberal	John M. Dods	10,572	27.08	–9.06
New Democratic	Bob Curran	7,781	19.93	+0.59
Libertarian	Sheldon M. Gold	399	1.02	–
Communist	Kris Hansen	394	1.01	–
Total valid votes		39,034	99.56	
Total rejected ballots		172	0.44	+0.05
Turnout		39,206	68.95	–2.51
Eligible voters		56,864		
Progressive Conservative hold		Swing		+7.75
Source: Elections Ontario

1975 Ontario general election
Party	Candidate	Votes	%	±%
Progressive Conservative	John Palmer MacBeth	17,739	44.51	+3.04
Liberal	Alex Marchetti	14,402	36.14	+7.81
New Democratic	Bob Curran	7,710	19.35	–10.85
Total valid votes		39,851	99.61	
Total rejected ballots		155	0.39	–0.28
Turnout		40,006	71.46	–1.15
Eligible voters		55,985		
Progressive Conservative hold		Swing		–2.39
Source: Elections Ontario

1971 Ontario general election
Party	Candidate	Votes	%	±%
Progressive Conservative	Nick Leluk	11,235	41.48	+9.84
New Democratic	Kealey Cummings	8,180	30.20	–3.66
Liberal	George Ben	7,673	28.33	–6.18
Total valid votes		27,088	99.33	
Total rejected ballots		183	0.67	–0.18
Turnout		27,271	72.61	+7.82
Eligible voters		37,557		
Progressive Conservative gain from Liberal		Swing		+8.01
Source: Elections Ontario

1967 Ontario general election
Party	Candidate	Votes	%	±%
Liberal	George Ben	8,038	34.50	+3.58
New Democratic	Kealey Cummings	7,889	33.86	+10.54
Progressive Conservative	Bev Lewis	7,370	31.63	–14.12
Total valid votes		23,297	99.15	
Total rejected ballots		200	0.85	–0.00
Turnout		23,497	64.79	+4.47
Eligible voters		36,267		
Liberal gain from Progressive Conservative		Swing		+8.85
Source: Elections Ontario

1963 Ontario general election
Party	Candidate	Votes	%	±%
Progressive Conservative	Bev Lewis	10,144	45.76	–
Liberal	Dante De Monte	6,856	30.92	–
New Democratic	John R. W. Whitehouse	5,170	23.32	–
Total valid votes		22,170	99.15	
Total rejected ballots		191	0.85	–
Turnout		22,361	60.32	–
Eligible voters		37,071		
Progressive Conservative notional hold		Swing		–
Source: Elections Ontario

=== York—Humber ===
1955 Ontario general election
Party	Candidate	Votes	Vote %
Progressive Conservative	W. Beverley Lewis	11,814	44.3
Liberal	Peter Slaght	7,684	28.8
CCF	F. Stroud	6,284	23.5
Labour-Progressive	Art Jenkyn	913	3.4
	Total	26,695	

1959 Ontario general election
Party	Candidate	Votes	Vote %
Progressive Conservative	W. Beverley Lewis	11,785	44.0
Liberal	John Van Esterik	8,518	31.8
CCF	Alex Maxwell	6,499	24.2
	Total	26,802	

== See also ==
- List of Ontario provincial electoral districts
- Canadian provincial electoral districts
