= Ontario sex education curriculum controversy =

Political debate in Ontario, Canada

The Ontario sex education curriculum controversy refers to the debates over reforms of the sex education curriculum in the province of Ontario during the 2010s.

In 2015, the government of Ontario, then led by Kathleen Wynne, introduced a new sex ed curriculum, updating it for the first time since 1998 and including topics such as sharing explicit content online, sexual orientation, and gender identity. A number of protests broke out against the new curriculum, and after the 2018 Ontario general election the new provincial government, led by Doug Ford, announced that it would be scrapping the changes and reverting to the 1998 curriculum. This move caused a further eruption of protests by supporters of the new curriculum this time, and in 2019 the government announced a different new curriculum that contained most of the updates contained in the 2015 curriculum.

== Background ==
Sex education is the instruction of issues relating to human sexuality, including aspects such as emotional relations and responsibilities, human sexual anatomy, sexual activity, sexual reproduction, age of consent, reproductive health, reproductive rights, safe sex, birth control and sexual abstinence. The United Nations Population Fund (UNFPA) recommends comprehensive sex education, as it enables young people to make informed decisions about their sexuality. Health Canada also recommends comprehensive sex education, stating that it is "a vital and integral part of your overall health and well-being throughout your life, integrating the emotional, physical, cognitive and social aspects of sexuality."

Studies have consistently shown that comprehensive sex education leads to a number of positive results, such as decreasing the rates of unintended pregnancies among teenagers.

A 2007 American review concluded that "no comprehensive program hastened the initiation of sex or increased the frequency of sex, results that many people fear" and that "comprehensive programs worked for both genders, for all major ethnic groups, for sexually inexperienced and experienced teens, in different settings, and in different communities."

In Canada, education and healthcare are provincial jurisdiction, and so each province has differing education systems and different sex education curricula. In Ontario, some form of sex education has been present in schools since the early 1900s. From 1925 to 1933, the Ontario Health Department charged nurse Agnes Haygarth to give lectures on health to public school children in rural Ontario, however, she mostly taught girls unless the school had a male health officer available. In 1966, the Ministry of Education recommended including sexual health topics in the curriculum, but the final decision on including those topics was left to individual school boards. In 1979, only one out of every six school boards in the province taught birth control in any grade. When the HIV/AIDS pandemic hit Ontario in the 1980s, the province finally introduced mandatory sex education in all schools across the province. In 1998, the government of Ontario had updated its sex education curriculum again, for the last time until 2010, at which point the Ontario curriculum was among the oldest among all Canadian provinces.

== Cancelled 2010 curriculum ==
In 2010, under then-Premier Dalton McGuinty, the government announced another update to the curriculum. Just a few days after the announced update, however, and after intense criticism from right-wing groups and conservative Christian groups in the province, the government backed down and cancelled the proposed update.

== 2015 curriculum ==
In 2013, McGuinty left politics, being replaced as Liberal leader by Kathleen Wynne, Wynne becoming the first woman to serve as premier of Ontario and the first openly gay person to hold the post of premier across all Canadian governments. In the 2014 Ontario general election, Wynne led the Liberals to an increase in seats, forming a majority government.

In October 2014, Wynne's government announced that they would be surveying parents from every single school in the province on the creation of a new sex education curriculum, with the goal of introducing a new curriculum in 2015. At the time, the Ontario curriculum was the oldest in Canada.

In late February 2015, the government announced the introduced of a new sex education curriculum, to begin in schools in September of that year. Among the changes brought into the new curriculum were:

- Grade 1 students being taught the proper names for body parts
- Grade 2 students being taught the broad concept of consent
- Grade 3 students being taught basic concepts of gender identity and sexuality
- Grade 4 students being taught about puberty
- Grade 5 students being taught about relationships
- Grade 6 students being taught about gender expression and masturbation
- Grade 7 & 8 students being taught about contraception, anal and oral sex, preventing pregnancy and sexually transmitted infections

The new curriculum also introduced lessons about how to communicate safely online, including the risks of cyberbullying, sharing personal information, and sharing explicit photos.

== Reactions to the 2015 curriculum ==
The 2015 new curriculum received polarising reactions, with critics attacking it as inappropriate and against parents' rights, while supporters argued that it was an overdue modernisation backed by evidence and that it was particularly necessary to help vulnerable minorities in Ontario, such as LGBT+ youth.

A May 2016 poll from Forum Research found that around 16% of respondents had considered pulling their children out of public schools in reaction to the new curriculum, and that 48% of Ontarians approved of the curriculum while 36% opposed it.

Some commentators called for more resources to be invested in public health to assist schools in providing sex education, especially as some of the issues at hand can be more complex to teach. Other commentators called for further broadening of the curriculum, to expand beyond just discussing risks and problems, but to also include discussions of how to foster positive aspects of health and relationships.

=== Support ===
The updated curriculum received a generally positive response from public health experts, who especially commended the introduction of lessons on consent and on internet safety. The curriculum also received for introducing discussions surrounding gender and sexual diversity, especially as discrimination against the LGBT+ population remains a significant issue in Canada.

Supporters of the curriculum also pointed to the scientific consensus, with studies over several decades repeatedly showing that comprehensive sex education had positive outcomes and does not result in many of the negative outcomes claimed by opponents of the curriculum. Supporters of the curriculum also argued that opponents were spreading misinformation about the curriculum, with factually incorrect claims such as that the curriculum offered how-to lessons on masturbation and anal sex having been widely circulated among groups that opposed the curriculum.

Clergyman and radio personality Michael Coren argued in a National Post column that criticism of the curriculum was exaggerated, stating that "most of the curriculum is more banality than Bolshevism," and that conservative Christians should spend more time protesting issues such as poverty and unjust wars than sexuality. Soon after publishing the column, Coren was fired from his position at far-right outlet Rebel News, with Rebel founder Ezra Levant accusing him of having confused and offended the Rebel's audience.

=== Opposition ===
The new curriculum received significant opposition among some sections of the Ontario population, especially among right-wing and conservative religious groups, leading to a number of protests. Some opponents argued that the curriculum introduced "too much, too soon," with some conservative parents stating that they would pull their children out of public schools in response to the curriculum. Opponents to the new curriculum also argued that the government had not sufficiently consulted parents.

On 14 April 2015, a demonstration opposed to the new curriculum was held in Queen's Park, attracting several thousand protestors.

Thorncliffe Park elementary school in Toronto announced that they would be offering a modified version of the new curriculum where teachers covered the key issue of inappropriate touching without being specific about body parts, with around 40% of Grade 1 students being moved to the modified version. The school had previously been the focus of several protests against the new curriculum.

=== Political parties ===
During the 2015 Progressive Conservative Party of Ontario leadership election, the eventual winner Patrick Brown pledged to repeal the new curriculum. However, by 2016, he stated that he was in favour of the new curriculum, but criticised the government for a lack of consultation. Wynne defended the curriculum against charges that her government hadn't led sufficient consultations, stating that "Parents were consulted. Psychologists, psychiatrists, police, people who live in communities and are concerned about the safety of young people were consulted. The way the curriculum was developed was not by politicians. It was developed by people who are educators and who understand child development and who understand what's appropriate."

Federal Conservative Party of Canada MP Parm Gill used a taxpayer-funded mailout to attack the curriculum, describing it as "graphic and explicit" and an attack on parents' rights. The mailout also attempted to link the curriculum to the federal Liberal Party of Canada, despite education being provincial jurisdiction and the federal Liberals having no affiliation with the Ontario Liberals.

In October 2016, the Stop the New Sex-Ed Agenda party was founded by Queenie Yu as a single issue party with a platform based on being in opposition to the new curriculum. It ran one candidate each in the 2016 by-elections in Ottawa—Vanier and Niagara West—Glanbrook, finishing with 1.3% and 0.2% of the vote respectively. It ran three candidates in the 2018 Ontario general election, none winning their races. After the 2018 election, the party came under some controversy surrounding their use of the tax credit on political donations to channel funding to lobbying groups.

=== Homophobia ===
Significant amounts of the criticism against the new curriculum centered on the inclusion of LGBT+ issues, leading to many supporters of the curriculum accusing opponents of homophobia and transphobia.

Jeff Crane, the principal of Thorncliffe Park Public School, which had been the epicentre of several protests against the new curriculum, stated that the protestors had "just come flat out and said that they don't want homosexual teachers in schools." The Thorncliffe Parents' Association, which was one of the main organisers of the protests, had made several social media posts saying that the school was allowing LGBT+ groups to indoctrinate children.

Progressive Conservative MPP Monte McNaughton faced accusations of homophobia after he stated in a parliamentary debate that Wynne, the first openly gay premier of any Canadian province, was "especially disqualified" from crafting sex education policies and after he accused 2015 PC leadership election candidate Christine Elliott of wanting to build "a little pink tent."

The conservative Campaign Life Coalition attacked the new curriculum, stating that it was brought in by "the gay-activist Premier of Ontario," that it encouraged immoral sex acts, that it would normalise homosexual families, and that it would cause "serious sexual confusion in the minds of children."

=== Benjamin Levin allegations ===
Federal MP Cheryl Gallant attacked the government of Ontario over the curriculum, alleging that it had been written by former deputy minister Benjamin Levin, who had been charged (and was later convicted) of three charges relating to making and distributing child pornography. The allegations gained some traction among opponents of the curriculum, pointing to several 2009 memos and interview where Levin had stated that "I was responsible for the operation of the Ministry of Education and everything that they do; I was brought in to implement the new education policy."

However, the Wynne's government rejected the allegation, starting that deputy ministers did not have responsibility for writing curricula. Minister of Education Liv Sandals stated that the claims were "disgusting" and that "Levin had absolutely nothing to do with the development of the content of the curriculum. So it's certainly a red herring that people are trying to feed parents." It was also noted that Levin had been fired from his role advising the government several years before the introduction of the new curriculum and that he had not been among the several hundred experts and dozens of expert organisations consulted in the development of the 2015 curriculum.

== 2018 general election and aftermath ==
During the 2018 Progressive Conservative Party of Ontario leadership election, several of the candidates led attacks against the 2015 curriculum update. Former Toronto city councillor and eventual winner of the leadership race Doug Ford argued that parents should have the final say on education, stating that "the sex-ed curriculum should be about facts, not teaching Liberal ideology," and accused former PC leader Patrick Brown of preventing the party from debating the curriculum. Runner-up Christine Elliott also stated she wished to change the new curriculum, stating that "I would open the curriculum up again, listen to what parents have to say." However, Caroline Mulroney, who finished in third, stated that she wouldn't attempt to make any changes.

During the 2018 Ontario general election, Ford continued to campaign against the 2015 curriculum, the Progressive Conservatives' platform pledging to "restore Ontario's previous sex-ed curriculum until we can install a new one that is age appropriate and based on real consultation with parents." During the election, Tanya Granic Allen, who had campaigned in the 2018 PC leadership election on an anti-sex ed platform, was dropped as the party's candidate for Mississauga Centre after a number of videos surfaced of her making homophobic and islamophobic statements.

The Progressive Conservatives then won a majority in the election, capturing 76 of the 124 seats in the Legislative Assembly of Ontario and returning to government for the first time since 2003.

On 12 July 2018, just over a month after the election, the new government held its first throne speech, in which it pledged that Ontarians could "count on your government to respect parents, teachers and students by getting back to basics and replacing failed ideological experiments in the classroom — with tried-and-true methods that work."

Later that month, the Ford government, with Lisa Thompson as the new Minister of Education, announced that the 2015 curriculum would be scrapped. Beginning in September 2018, schools would revert to teaching an interim curriculum, made up of the old 1998 curriculum and a few updates from the cancelled 2010 curriculum. The government also announced that it was planning to hold consultations to write a different new curriculum, without specifying when such a different new curriculum would be introduced.

The changes of the 2018 interim curriculum to the 2015 curriculum included:

- The elimination of references to proper names of genitalia
- A reduction in detail about physical changes during puberty, such as eliminating references to breast development
- The elimination of references to masturbation
- The elimination of references to gender stereotypes and specific gender identities, and moving discussions about sexual orientation from Grade 3 and 6 up to Grade 7
- The elimination of several elements relating to Indigenous teachings
- Portrayal of abstinence as a positive choice for everyone instead of as a personal choice
- The elimination of references to consent

== Reactions to the 2018 interim curriculum ==
The government's move to scrap the 2015 curriculum was widely condemned by public health experts, who argued that reverting to the 1998 curriculum put Ontario sex education severely out of date and risked jeopardizing the health of Ontario students. In early August 2018, a petition signed by over 1800 medical professionals in the province was presented to the Legislative Assembly of Ontario calling on the province to reinstate the 2015 curriculum. The petition was also endorsed by a number of organizations, including the Registered Nurses Association of Ontario, the Society of Obstetricians and Gynaecologists, the Nurse Practitioners' Association of Ontario, the Association of Ontario Midwives, Canadian Women in Medicine, the Ontario Association of Social Workers, the Ontario Medical Students Association, and Planned Parenthood.

Many education experts stated that the interim curriculum would cause confusion, as the government failed to provide clear guidelines on what teachers were allowed or not allowed to teach and as the government failed to provide teachers with clear comparisons between the interim and 2015 curricula. Some education experts also noted that the interim curriculum often used much vaguer language than the 2015 curriculum and that the 2015 curriculum had been around two hundred pages longer as it contained much more precise details. Over 25 school boards in the province officially expressed concerns about the government's move and asked for clarification on what they were allowed to teach.

The Ford government was also opposed by many teachers and teachers' unions. The Elementary Teachers Federation of Ontario denounced the scrapping of the 2015 curriculum, stating that it was "irresponsible, discriminatory, and jeopardizes the safety of the students that we teach," and that the Federation would defend any teacher that continued to use the 2015 curriculum in their lessons. The Ontario Secondary School Teachers' Federation also pledged to defend teachers who continued to use the 2015 curriculum.

LGBT+ rights groups and activists in the province denounced the scrapping of the curriculum, noting that there would now be no mention of sexual orientation or gender identity in Ontario sex education and warning that it put LGBT+ youth at increased risk. Protests against the Ford government featured in the 2018 Ottawa Pride parade, with marchers chanting "Sex ed saves lives!" At the 2018 PC party conference, a resolution was passed calling to "remove the teaching and promotion of 'gender identity theory' from Ontario schools and its curriculum."

Protests were held against the government's move to scrap the curriculum in July 2018, including in Toronto and in Ottawa. The father of Rehtaeh Parsons denounced the Ontario government, stating that "what happened to my daughter was preventable... it was preventable with a good sex education program."

The move to scrap the curriculum also faced a significant amount of opposition from students themselves. In September 2018, tens of thousands of students across around 75 Ontario high schools organised a walkout to protest against the government and to demand that student voices be included in further consultations over the curriculum.

In December 2018, a number of United Nations Human Rights Council Special Rapporteurs issued a notice against the government of Ontario, noting that the 1998 curriculum "lacks a number of the necessary elements of a comprehensive and non-discriminatory sexuality education programme" and that "the declarations from the Minister of Education and the Premier of Ontario seem consistent with a worrying global trend of attempts to reinforce gender stereotypes and roll back progress that has been made in achieving gender equality."

The move to scrap the 2015 curriculum was opposed by both the Ontario Liberal Party and the Ontario New Democratic Party. NDP leader Andrea Horwath stated that "Doug Ford's plan to plow ahead with a sex-ed curriculum that was written before Google existed not only shortchanges students — it puts their health at risk." The move to scrap the curriculum also garnered reactions from other provinces, with Alberta Minister of Education David Eggen stating that the Ford government's changes were a "gong show."

Some commentators characterised the move to scrap the 2015 curriculum as characteristic of Ford's right-wing populism and as part of an attempt to reverse any policies that the previous, Liberal Party, government had introduced. The move also drew comparisons to American president Donald Trump, characterised as an attempt to wage right-wing culture wars in Ontario.

=== Support ===
Opponents of the 2015 curriculum applauded the government's move to scrap it. Mary Ellen Douglas, national organizer for the conservative group Campaign Life Coalition, stated that "We have a premier who says what he means and does what he says, and that is great. He promised to do this and he's carrying through with his promise very quickly." Right-wing evangelical activist Charles McVety, the president of the Canada Christian College, stated that "the fruit of the poisonous tree has been cut down" in response to the scrapping of the 2015 curriculum and that sex education "needs to be based on parents, not based on post-graduate researchers.".

Some commentators attacked teachers' unions over their opposition to the government, arguing that teachers' unions were out-of-touch and too eager to pick fights with the government. Journalist and former PC candidate Randall Denley argued that "it's about time someone reminded teachers' unions how the world works. If they are allowed to teach whatever they like when it comes to sex-ed, what will they do about math?"

Other commentators argued that taking time to review a controversial curriculum would ultimately be a good thing. The National Post newspaper released an editorial defending the government, stating that "having those views doesn't make one a bigot or a prude. Taking an extra year to review the curriculum perhaps isn't ideal, but it's also no catastrophe."

=== Legal challenges ===
The Canadian Civil Liberties Association announced that it would be challenging the government in court, arguing that the scrapping of the 2015 curriculum violated anti-discrimination laws of the Canadian Charter of Rights and Freedoms, the Ontario Human Rights Code, and the Ontario Education Act.

In September 2018, the Justice for Children and Youth legal clinic in Toronto announced that they would be bringing human rights complaints against the government on behalf of two transgender students, arguing that the government's removal of all LGBT+-related material from the curriculum constituted discrimination.

In October 2018, the Ontario Human Rights Commission joined a legal challenge against the government, stating that "the children most affected by the changes to the education curriculum are the same children who are at the highest risk of exclusion, harassment and violence." The Grand Council of Treaty 3 also joined the legal challenge, arguing that Indigenous youth were particularly vulnerable and that the government was "perpetuating the disadvantage and risk this population already experiences."

During the hearing of the Civil Liberties Association case, documents were presented showing that the government had also considered suspending all sex ed in Ontario.

In February 2019, the divisional court dismissed the Civil Liberties Association case, stating that even if the interim curriculum had excluded many inclusions of the 2015 curriculum, there was no breach of the Human Rights Code as teachers weren't prevented from teaching those elements according to their professional judgement.

=== Snitch line ===
In response to teachers stating that they would continue to teach the 2015 curriculum, the government set up a system to report teachers who did so. Critics quickly dubbed the system a "snitch line," especially as the government threatened reprisals against those teachers, with Ford stating that "We will not tolerate anybody using our children as pawns for grandstanding and political games. Make no mistake, if we find somebody failing to do their job, we will act."

The snitch line saw significant backlash from teachers, who argued that it was an attempt to manufacture a crisis instead of addressing real issues in schools, that it would prevent teachers and parents from communicating with each other about issues in schools, and complaints processes already existed for schools in Ontario. Sam Hammond, president of the Elementary Teachers' Federation of Ontario, called the snitch line "unprecedented, outrageous, and shameful! This is a blatant attack on the professionalism of teachers."

The snitch line was also criticised for allowing anonymous suggestions from anywhere in the world, with the reporting form not even requiring an email. Critics argued that the government would have no way of ensuring the authenticity of reports filed through the system and that it would ultimately be used as a tool to intimidate teachers. As well, some commentators criticised the snitch line as an attempt at censorship.

Satire groups made heavy use of the snitch line in parodies of the Ford government, including both This Hour Has 22 Minutes and The Beaverton.

== 2019 curriculum ==
The first results of the Ford government's online consultation were obtained by the Canadian Press through a freedom-of-information request in late 2018, showing a large majority in favour of the 2015 curriculum, with only about two dozen out of 1600 responses supporting the move to scrap it. When questioned if he would respect the results of the consultation, Ford stated that he believed "certain groups" had skewed the results.

In August 2019, the Ford government unveiled their new curriculum. The government also announced that school boards would be required to develop a procedure allowing parents to exempt their child from instruction of the human development and sexual health component of the curriculum.

The 2019 curriculum received generally mixed reactions, with supporters of the 2015 curriculum noting that it contained most of the same elements and introduced elements concerning vaping and concussions, while opponents of the 2015 curriculum applauding the fact that the government would allow parents to opt their kids out. However, some critics noted that the 2019 curriculum de-emphasised LGBT+ issues compared to the 2015 one, such as through moving lessons about gender identity up from Grade 6 to Grade 8. Other critics noted that the changes the government brought to the 2015 curriculum could've been accomplished within the frame of the curriculum and did not require the level of inflamed rhetoric and time spent on controversy by the government.

Some political commentators characterised the 2019 curriculum as part of the Ford government's tendency to announce controversial measures, be faced with significant protests, and then backtrack, noting that the government had followed a similar pattern in other controversies, such as the 2019 Ontario Autism Program controversy and the 2018 Franco-Ontarian Black Thursday.

== Further developments ==
In late-2020, the Ford government introduced a bill to the Legislative Assembly of Ontario to give Canada Christian College official university status. The college, and its president Charles McVety in particular, had been among the most vocal opponents of the 2015 curriculum and had supported Ford's campaign for the Progressive Conservative leadership. The bill had also been introduced without the Postsecondary Education Quality Assessment Board (PEQAB) having completed review of the college's request to create new Bachelor of Arts and Bachelor of Science degree programs or its request to change its name to the Canada University and School of Graduate Theological Studies. In May 2021, the government announced that the "PEQAB has recommended that the institution not be granted expanded degree-granting authority or a name change at this time" and that "The minister has reviewed and accepts their recommendation."

A 2021 Canadian Public Health Association study of high school aged youth found that:

The youth in our study expressed that they needed comprehensive approaches to their sexual health education, which meant learning about a wider range of topics covering various aspects of sexual health, relationships, and well-being, without educators skipping over or omitting any content that was relevant, scientifically accurate or factual. Participants also expressed the need for inclusivity in their sexual health education by ensuring that information considers and addresses the issues and needs of diverse groups of people.

Another study from 2021 that surveyed Canadian parents on sex education found that almost 90% of parents supported including lessons on gender identity in sex ed curricula.

== See also ==
- Sex education curriculum
- Comprehensive sex education
- Education in Ontario
- Premiership of Doug Ford
