= Benjamin Levin =

Benjamin Levin or Ben Levin may refer to:

- Benjamin Levin (academic) (born 1952), Canadian academic, civil servant, and convicted child pornographer
- Benjamin Levin (musician) (born 1988), American rapper, songwriter and record producer performing as Benny Blanco
- Ben Levin, the co-creator of Craig of the Creek
- Ben Levin, former guitarist of the American band Bent Knee
