= Protecting Ontario Elections Act, 2021 =

Protecting Ontario Elections Act
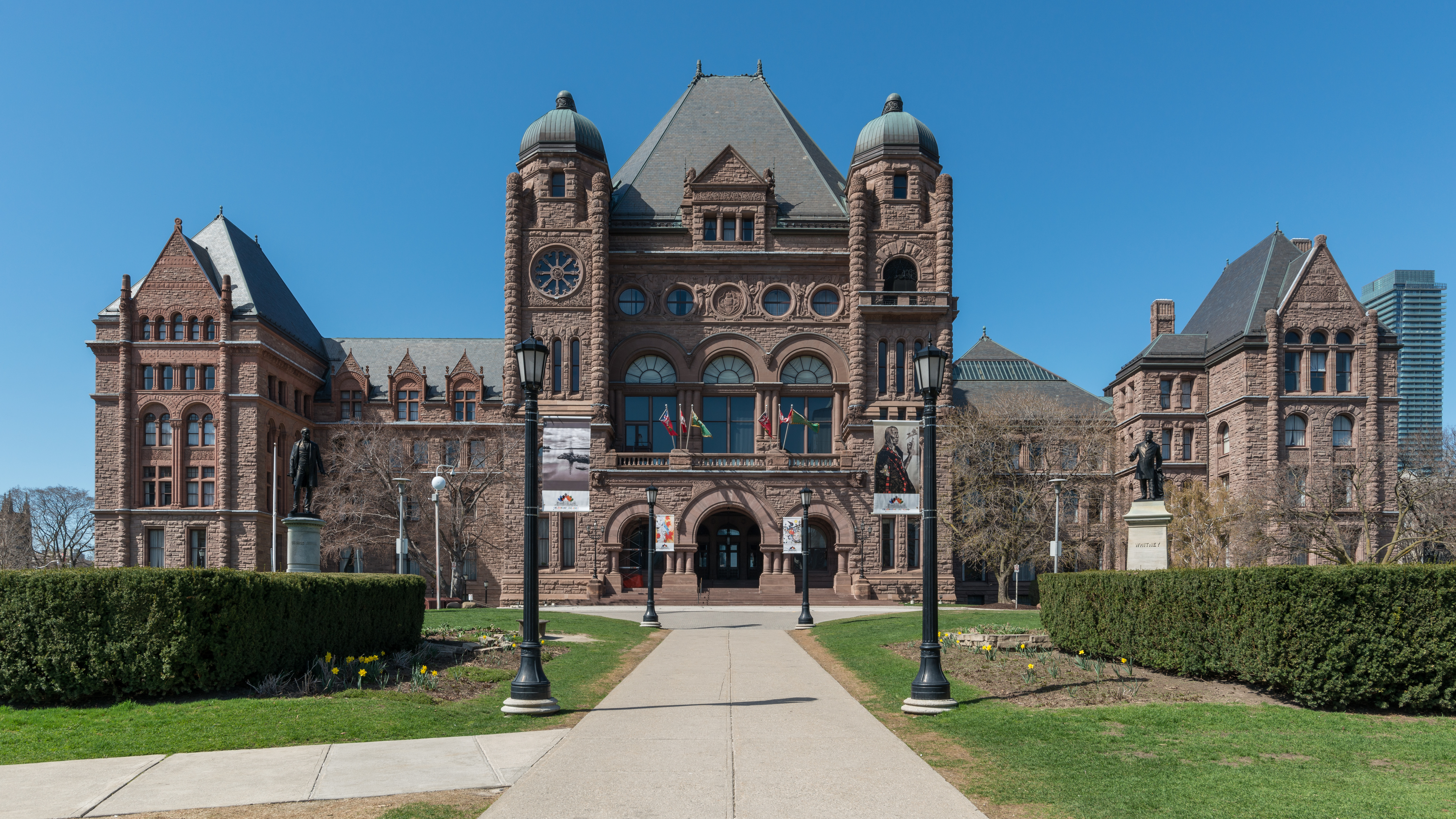

Legislative Assembly of Ontario
- Long title: An Act to amend various Acts with respect to elections and members of the Assembly (Bill 254, 2021)
- Territorial extent: Ontario
- Enacted by: Legislative Assembly of Ontario
- Royal assent: 19 April 2021

Legislative history
- First reading: 25 February 2021
- Second reading: 22 March 2021
- Third reading: 15 April 2021

The Protecting Ontario Elections Act (Bill 254, 2021; French: Loi de 2021 sur la protection des élections en Ontario) is a law in the province of Ontario, Canada that made a number of changes to electoral law in Ontario ahead of the 43rd Ontario general election, to be held at the latest in June 2022.

== Summary ==
The law brought in a number of changes to elections in Ontario, including doubling donation limits, extending the per-vote public subsidy for political parties, tweaking the limits on third-party advertising, giving the chief elector officer power to issue fines for minor infractions of the election laws, amending the Members' Integrity Act, 1994 to cover MPPs' social media accounts, as well as a number of changes to the Municipal Elections Act, 1996.

== Legislative history ==
The bill was introduced to the Legislative Assembly of Ontario on 25 February 2021 by Attorney-General Doug Downey. It passed third reading on 15 April and received royal assent four days later.

== Reception ==
After the bill received royal assent, the Elementary Teachers’ Federation of Ontario, Ontario English Catholic Teachers’ Association, and the Ontario Secondary School Teachers’ Federation announced that they would be filing a Charter challenge against it, claiming that the bill violated their freedom of expression and association. Others criticised the bill with claims that it could be used by the government to stifle opposition, especially as Ford's government came under heavy criticism for its handling of the COVID-19 pandemic in Ontario.

The bill also received criticism from some for extending the public per-vote subsidy, especially as Ford had campaigned on ending the subsidy in the 2018 election.
