= Ford government =

The Ford government may refer to:

- Presidency of Gerald Ford in the United States
- Doug Ford (premiership · ministry) in Ontario, Canada
