= 2019 Ontario Autism Program controversy =

Controversy in Ontario, Canada

Changes to the Ontario Autism Programme in 2019 by the government of Ontario, led by Premier Doug Ford, caused significant controversy, resulting in a number of protests. After announcing the changes in February, aimed at clearing the long waiting list for the programme, but resulting in the potential loss of access to the service for many families, the government eventually partly reversed its reforms.

== Background ==
In 2014, while a city councillor in Toronto, Ford came under criticism after opposing a group home for developmentally disabled people, including those with autism, in a west Etobicoke neighbourhood. He was first alleged to have told members of the home that they had "ruined the community", and then attempted to defend himself by stating that the presence of the home had dropped property prices in the neighbourhood and had been a "nightmare" for its neighbours. After the father of an autistic son filed an integrity complaint against Ford over the scandal, Ford told the Toronto Sun newspaper that the father had launched a jihad against him and that "he can go to hell, I don't even care." The controversy was raised again during Ford's run in the 2014 Toronto mayoral election, to which Ford responded by stating that the media had distorted the issue.

In 2016, the government of Ontario, then led by the Ontario Liberal Party and Premier Kathleen Wynne, announced that it would be eliminating government-funded access to intensive behaviour therapy for children aged five and above. After a significant outcry, the government reversed its decision and announced an additional $200 million in funding over the next four years.

In the 2018 Ontario general election, the Progressive Conservative Party of Ontario, led by Doug Ford, won a majority in the election, capturing 76 of the 124 seats in the Legislative Assembly of Ontario and returning to government for the first time since 2003. As part of their platform, the PCs to add 100 million $ in funding per year to the Ontario Autism Programme. At the time of the election, there were 23 000 children on the waiting list for access to autism-related services in Ontario.

== Ontario Autism Programme reforms ==
In November 2018, along with other cuts such as the 2018 Franco-Ontarian Black Thursday, the Ford government announced that it would be eliminating the Office of the Provincial Advocate for Children and Youth.

On 4 February 2019, Progressive Conservative MPP Amy Fee published an article in the Toronto Star decrying the state of autism services in the province, stating that

"Parents have had to leave their jobs to support their child. Many were overcome with emotion just talking about their daily struggles to find help and their extreme stress and anxiety. Most of the families I spoke with just don't understand why a small number of children get service, while the majority are on wait-lists. And, there are in fact multiple wait-lists. There's a wait-list to receive a diagnosis, a wait-list to access provincial funding and another for private providers. All this waiting is adding to their stress and keeping children from accessing much needed therapy."

Two days later, Lisa MacLeod, the Minister of Children, Community and Social Services, held a press conference at Holland Bloorview Kids Rehabilitation Hospital to announce a number of reforms to the Ontario Autism Programme, stating that "we've heard how the autism program isn't working for the families who need support for their children." Among the reforms, the government would be doubling investment in autism diagnostic hubs up to $5,5 million a year, providing direct funding to families instead of to regional service providers, and set the target of clearing the waiting list for the programme within 18 months. However, the direct funding to families would be front-loaded based on age, was limited to $5000 a year after the age of six, and was limited to a maximum total of $140 000 across the child's lifetime. The reforms would also establish a government agency charged with assessing funding eligibility for families and providing them advice on which services to purchase.

=== Reactions ===
The government's reforms were met with severe criticism, especially from families with autistic children in the province. Among the criticisms were that the changes would base funding on age instead of need and that the amount of funding would be inadequate, with the $5000 cap on funding per year risking services for children in need of intensive programmes, which can cost more than that per month.

As well, critics of the reforms argued that the reforms would reduce the number of therapy hours available to children. The reforms additionally would be means-tested, basing funding off of a family's income instead of off of a family's needs. Janet McLaughlin, professor at Wilfrid Laurier University, stated that the changes were like "assigning a standard amount of physiotherapy to every person with back injuries, whether they actually require back surgery or whether they could just benefit from stretching exercises. It makes no sense and it undermines the needs of children who most deeply require intensive services."

The reforms were also criticised for failing to take into account the needs of autistic adults. Schitt's Creek actor and autism advocate Eugene Levy spoke out against the reforms, stating that "the autism fund is only applicable to kids who are under the age of 18. As if when they turn 18, they just outgrow their autism."

Other commentators expressed concern about the impact the reforms could have on schools in Ontario, noting that children could be pushed out of therapy and into schools that didn't have the resources needed or accommodation measures in place. As well, critics pointed out that the educational assistants in schools could not serve as substitutes for therapists and were often already forced to pay out of their own pockets to receive training for their job. Harvey Bischof, president of the Ontario Secondary School Teachers' Federation, stated that "A significant increase in the number of specialized support staff in our schools is essential if we want to provide all the support that students with special needs require and deserve."

The changes did have a few supporters. After the reforms were announced, the Toronto Sun published an editorial defended the government, stating that "MacLeod's solution isn't perfect; not everyone's happy. But at least it provides a little something for everyone as opposed to the previous system which provided everything for a minority of parents and nothing for everyone else."

== Protests ==
The day the reforms were announced, Bruce McIntosh, a Progressive Conservative legislative assistant and former president of the Ontario Autism Coalition, announced his resignation as a parliamentary staffer in protest, stating that "the decisions that the government has made are absolutely wrongheaded."

On 8 February, a protest was held in front of MacLeod's constituency office in Ottawa, with around 50 parents of autistic children in attendance.

In mid-February, McLeod issued an apology over accusations of bullying a group of Ontario Association for Behaviour Analysis experts, after having threatened "four long years' for the organization" if it didn't publicly support the government's reforms.

In late-February, after Progressive Conservative MPP Randy Hillier taunted the protestors in the Legislative Assembly, Ford suspended him indefinitely from the PC caucus. He was subsequently permanently removed from the PC caucus the next month.

On 7 March 2019, another large protest was held at Queen's Park, attracting hundreds more protestors. MacLeod refused to face the protests and refused to answer questions from journalists that day, stating she feared for her safety. Around a dozen protesting parents had been kicked out of the Legislative Assembly galleries during the day after shouting at MPPs during Question Period. Two days later, a woman was arrested by the Ottawa police force on charges of harassing MacLeod.

On 26 March, MacLeod announced that the government would be making a number of changes in response to the protests. Among the changes were the scrapping of means testing for the programme, an increase of services eligible to receive funding, and a significant increase in funding for the programme.

On 2 April 2019, the same day as World Autism Awareness Day, the government announced that the government would begin a consultation period with parents of autistic children beginning in May and would be setting up an advisory panel to give the government advice.

In mid-May, Ford was loudly booed at the opening ceremony for the 2019 Ontario Special Olympics Invitational Youth Games because of the Ontario Autism Programme reforms, with a poll that week finding that 75% of Ontarians felt his government was on the wrong track.

In late May, a parent of two children with autism sent Ford a text message accusing the government of corruption over the cuts. In response, Ford called the parent and warned him that "you got to be very, very careful when you tell someone that they're corrupt. Very, very, very careful. Okay, my friend? I'll talk to you later." After the parent publicly posted the details of the call and the perceived threat, the hashtag #FordCorruptAF trended on social media.

An internal review of the government's cuts prepared by MPP Roman Baber and obtained by The Globe And Mail newspaper in June 2019 found that the government had deliberately spread "unverified and is likely inaccurate" information about the state of autism care in Ontario and that the government's initial actions "resulted in absurdity" that would've left most families destitute. Later that month, Ford held a press conference defending his government, stating that "What boggles my mind: we're pouring, pouring money into autism, and focused on it, listening to the experts, not the bunch of politicians, but listening to the experts. We're helping them and they're protesting? I don't know. I question that."

Later that month, almost 300 employees at the Erinoakkids Centre for Treatment and Development were fired, with the Centre stating the firings were due to the government's changes to autism funding.

On 21 June 2019, Ford announced a major reshuffle of his cabinet. As part of the reshuffle, MacLeod was demoted down to Minister of Tourism, Culture and Sport. Bay of Quinte MPP Todd Smith was named as her replacement as Minister of Children, Community and Social Services.

In July, the Ford government announced that it would be mostly backing down from the reforms, announcing that it would be tasking the advisory panel to determine a sustainable, needs-based programme instead.

In September 2019, Child and Community Resources, a major autism-service provider in Northern Ontario, announced that it would no longer be able to offer therapy to new families and that it had cut 90 positions over the previous year. The centre blamed the government's reforms for the cuts, with executive director Sherry Fournier stating that "my worry has been from the start that the north will feel this first. And we are running out of time. If we wait much longer, we're not going to have any staff at all."

In early October 2019, a group of families announced that they would be suing the government over the changes, alleging breach of contract, negligence, and breach of sections 7 and 15 of the Canadian Charter of Rights and Freedoms. Some of the families had previously sued the then-Liberal government over a decade earlier, the judge ruling that an age six funding cap was discriminatory.

In late October 2019, the autism advisory panel released its report, calling for a number of changes to the Ontario Autism Program, including the expansion of core services, the provision of funding based on an individual child's needs, the end of the use of seclusion rooms in schools, and each family being assigned a care co-ordinator with the goal of helping them navigate the government programme. The report also recommended that the government cover the cost of travel for access to services for people living in Northern Ontario and the need to build more services in the north.

== Further developments ==
A report from the Financial Accountability Officer in July 2020 found that the waiting list had grown to a total of 27 600 children, up by more than four thousand from the time of the election, and estimated that ensuring all children had access to autism services would cost around $1,35 billion, more than double the government's current budget for autism services.

In December 2020, the government released a series of guidelines for independent agencies wishing to be contracted to run Ontario's autism program. The guidelines came under criticism for allegedly ignoring the recommendations of the autism advisory panel and for taking final decisions out of the hands of medical professionals.

In January 2021, the government announced that it would extending the funding extension for the autism program for another year, stating that a needs-based system for the programme wouldn't be ready until April 2021

600 children began receiving services under the new programme in March 2021. However, families still criticised the government for falling short of the promises it had made, with the head of the Ontario Autism Coalition stating that "there's a lot of disappointment in the community — even though they are calling it needs-based, it is lacking."

In May 2021, over 8700 people signed a petition Giant Steps, a school and therapy centre for elementary school-aged children with autism, after the York Region District School Board announced that it would be ending its partnership with the centre. The School Board stated that, with changes made by the government to the Children Treatment Network, it felt it had enough resources to fully operate autism services without working with an outside provider.

== See also ==
- Autism rights movement
- Premiership of Doug Ford
