= Benjamin Levin (academic) =

Canadian academic (born 1952)

- Born: Benjamin Ruvin Levin; 1952 (age 73–74); West Kildonan, Manitoba, Canada
- Title: Manitoba Deputy Minister of Advanced Education (1999–2002); Manitoba Deputy Minister of Education, Training and Youth (1999–2002); Ontario Deputy Minister of Education (2004–2007)
- Criminal charges: Making and distributing child pornography; counselling to commit an indictable offence
- Criminal penalty: 3 years' incarceration

Academic background
- Education: University of Manitoba; Harvard University; University of Toronto
- Thesis: Experience of Managing (1982)

Academic work
- Discipline: Education
- Institutions: University of Manitoba; University of Toronto

Benjamin Ruvin Levin (born 1952) is a Canadian former civil servant, educational scholar, and convicted sex offender. He was a Canada Research Chair in Education Leadership and Policy at the Ontario Institute for Studies in Education (OISE), University of Toronto. He served for three years in the Ontario Liberal provincial government of Dalton McGuinty, as Deputy Minister in the Ministry of Education, after having held a similar post in Manitoba. He also served as an advisor to Ontario Premier Kathleen Wynne.

On March 3, 2015, Levin pleaded guilty to three charges relating to making and distributing child pornography. He was sentenced to three years' imprisonment. He only spent three months of his sentence in jail before being paroled.

== Early life ==
Levin was born in 1952 into a Jewish family in West Kildonan, a suburb of Winnipeg, Manitoba. He was the second of four brothers.

== Career ==
Levin holds a Bachelor of Arts from the University of Manitoba, a Masters of Education from Harvard University as well as an honorary doctorate from the University of Ottawa.

As a civil servant, he first served for the Province of Manitoba as Deputy Minister of Advanced Education and as Deputy Minister of Education, Training and Youth from 1999 through 2002. He then served as the Deputy Minister of Education for the Province of Ontario for three years from 2004 to 2007 and again from 2008 to 2009 under a Liberal government.

As an academic, Levin has published eight books, including "Making a Difference in Urban Schools" (with Jane Gaskell, University of Toronto Press), "More High School Graduates" (Corwin Press) and "Breaking Barriers" (with Avis Glaze and Ruth Mattingley, Pearson Canada) and more than 200 other articles on education, conducted many research studies, and has spoken and consulted on education issues around the world, including serving on the governing council of the National College for School Leadership in England.

Levin was academic director for Ontario's new Knowledge Network for Applied Education Research, funded by the Ministry of Education to improve the sharing of research findings and their use in policy and practice. The government of Ontario suspended him upon his arrest on child-pornography charges in July 2013.

Levin headed the "Research Supporting Practice in Education" (RSPE), a program of research and related activities aimed at learning more about building strong linkages between research, policy and practice, referred to as Knowledge Mobilization (KM). RSPE is headquartered at OISE/University of Toronto and supported with core funds from the Canada Research Chairs program. Levin was the principal investigator working with academic colleagues and graduate students.

== Child exploitation convictions ==
On July 8, 2013, Levin was arrested by the Toronto Police Service sex-crimes unit and charged with seven counts of child exploitation, including charges of possessing and accessing child pornography. He had been a suspect of the police service since mid-2012. He was released on $100,000 bail.

According to a letter sent by Levin to his former colleagues he would "be pleading guilty on March 3, 2015 to three of the seven charges, namely one count of possession of child pornography, one count of making written child pornography, and one count of counselling a sexual assault." As well, the judge noted that though Levin did not plead guilty to this offence, he unquestionably also distributed child pornography, including sending various images to the undercover officers who were investigating him. On May 29, 2015, he was sentenced to three years in prison. He only spent three months of his sentence in jail before being paroled.

== Awards ==
Levin was listed in the "Who's Who of Canada" and was ranked the fifth-most influential knowledge mobilization (KM) leader in Canada. In 2003, Levin was awarded the Canadian Education Association's Whitworth Award for contributions to education research. The following year he received the Lieutenant Governor of Manitoba's Medal for Service to Public Administration In 2010, he was named Outstanding Educator of the Year, by Phi Delta Kappa's Toronto chapter and in 2012 he was awarded one of four Max Bell Foundation National Awards in Canada for Innovation Ideas.

== Publications and media ==
- 2012 – More high school graduates: How Schools Can Save Students from Dropping Out. Thousand Oaks, CA: Corwin Press
- 2012 – (with Jane Gaskell) Making a difference in urban schools. Toronto: University of Toronto Press
- 2012 – (with Avis Glaze and Ruth Mattingley). Breaking barriers: Excellence and equity in education. Toronto: Pearson and Ontario Principals Council
- 2012 – System-Wide Improvement in Education, commissioned by UNESCO (policy series)
- 2008 – How To Change 5000 Schools, by Harvard Education Press. It outlines the educational, managerial and political requirements for creating positive and lasting improvement in whole systems of schools and has been cited widely internationally.
- 2003 – Approaches to Equity in Policy for Lifelong Learning, Commissioned by the OECD
