= Premiership of Doug Ford =

26th and current premier of Ontario, Canada

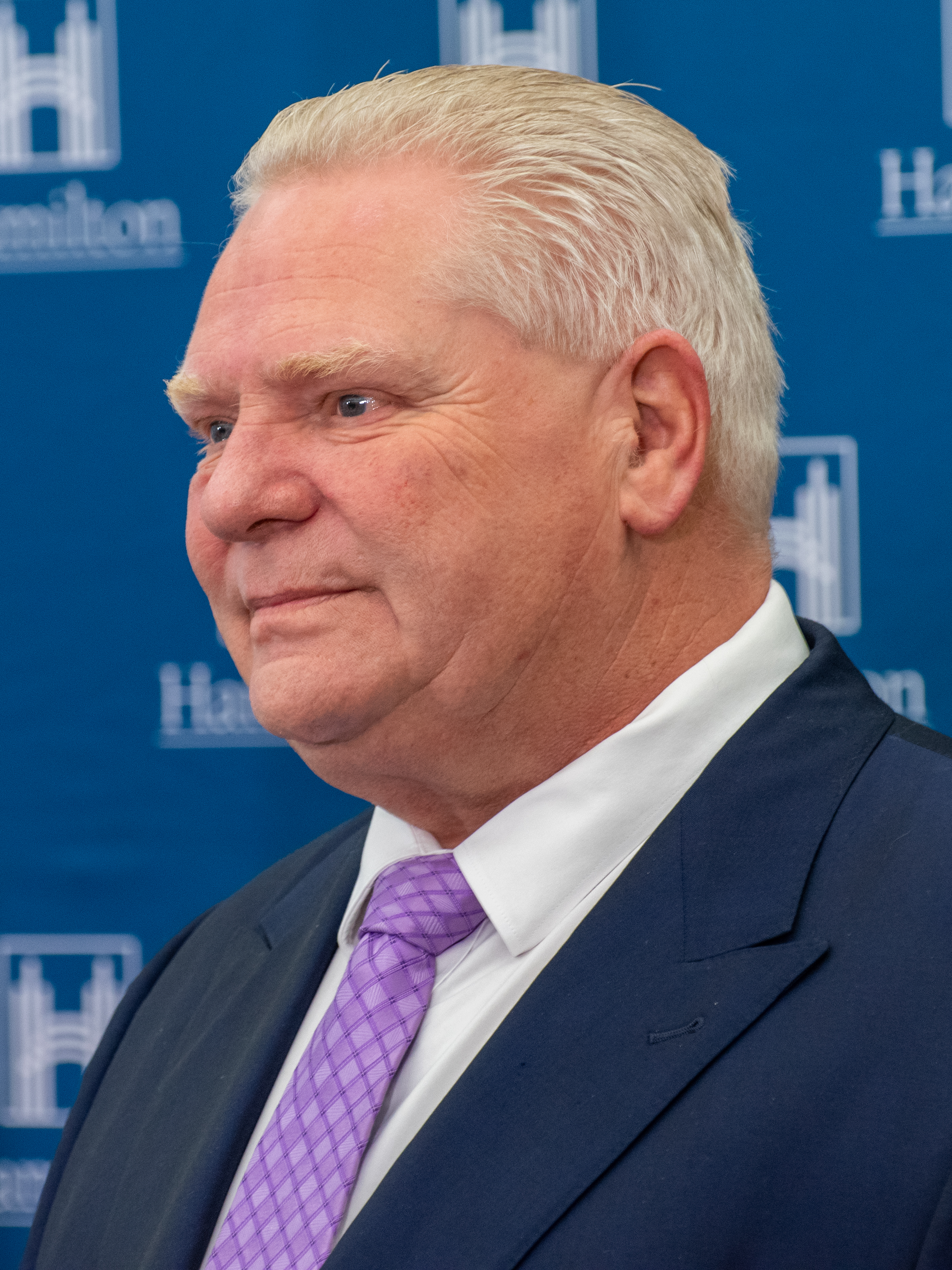
- Premiership of Doug Ford; June 29, 2018 – present
- Monarchs: Elizabeth II; Charles III
- Premier: Doug Ford
- Cabinet: Ford Ministry
- Party: Ontario Conservative Party
- Election: 2018; 2022; 2025
- Appointed by: Elizabeth Dowdeswell
- Seat: Queen's Park, Toronto
- Constituency: Etobicoke North

Doug Ford is the 26th and current premier of Ontario (French: Premier ministre de l'Ontario), Canada. He won a majority in the 2018 Ontario general election, as leader of the Ontario Conservative Party caucus in the Legislative Assembly of Ontario and was sworn in as premier on June 29, 2018. He was re-elected with an increased majority in 2022, and again after calling a snap election for February 27, 2025.

== Elections ==
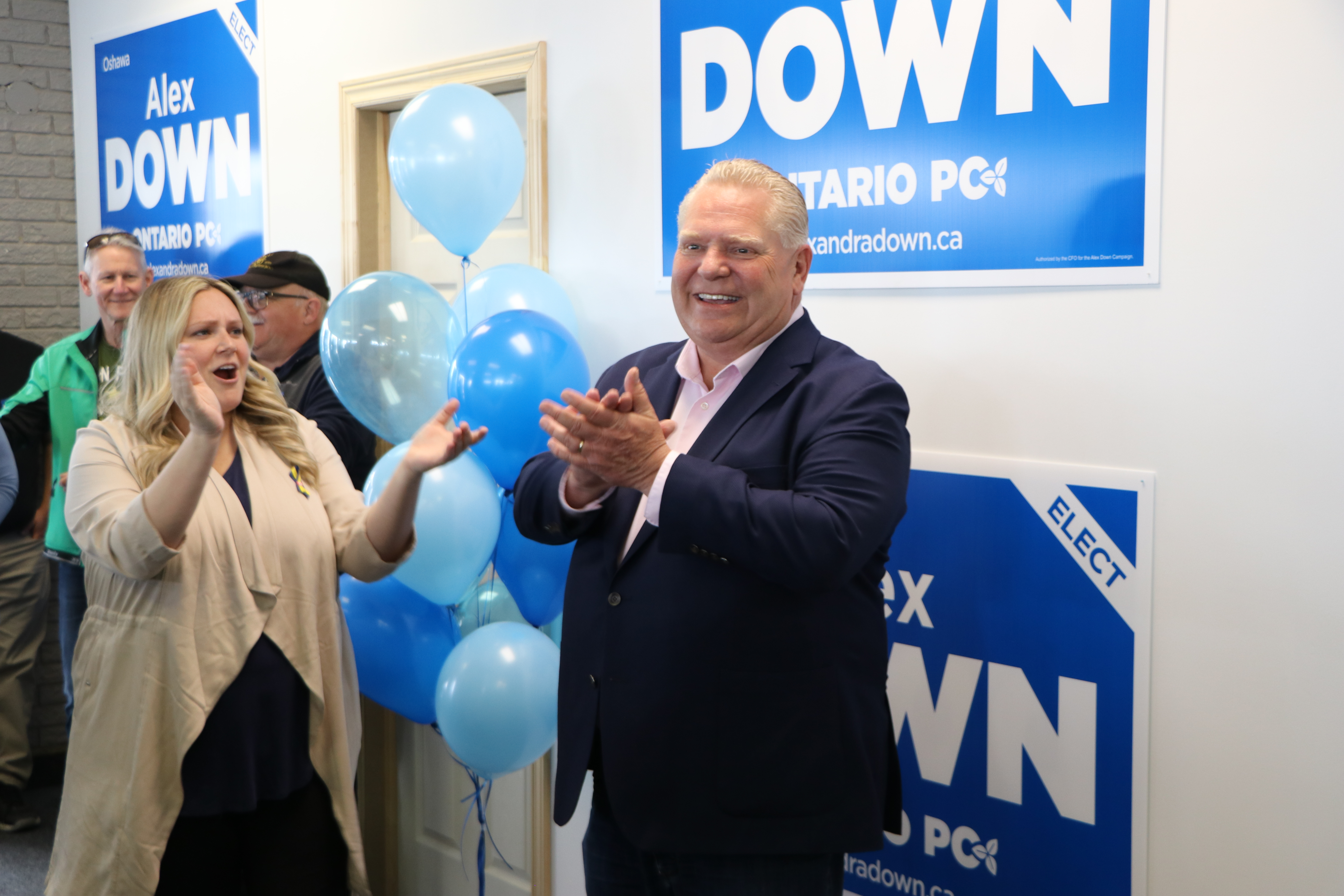
Ford at a PC campaign office in 2022

=== 2018 Ontario general election ===
Ford won the Progressive Conservative Party of Ontario leadership election on March 10, 2018. He represented Etobicoke North.

In the 2018 Ontario general election held on June 7, Ford won a majority government with 76 of the 124 seats in the legislature with approximately 56.67% of potential voters voting.

=== 2022 Ontario general election ===
Ford led the Progressive Conservatives to another majority government in the 2022 provincial election. The PCs gained seven more seats than they had won in 2018.

=== 2025 Ontario general election ===
Ford won an 36-seat majority in the 44th Ontario general election. Originally scheduled by election date laws to be held by June 4, 2026, Ford triggered an early provincial election, called a snap election, for February 27, 2025, after meeting with Ontario's lieutenant-governor.

== Policies and events in office ==
=== Economic policy ===
Ford's government cancelled the basic income pilot project. He opposes the laying off of government workers. He supports the use of attrition to eliminate government jobs that he believes are not needed. Ford believes in hiring independent auditors to audit government spending. Jay Goldberg of the Canadian Taxpayers Federation labelled Ford's spending excessive and noted Ontario's large debt increases under his government.

In June 2019, Rod Phillips, who served as Minister of the Environment, Conservation and Parks, replaced Vic Fedeli as Ontario's finance minister. Andrea Khanjin was appointed as Parliamentary Assistant to the Minister of the Environment, Conservation and Parks in June 2018.

Starting in January 2019, those who are working full-time and earning less than $30,000 a year would pay no provincial income tax, in the new LIFT program but minimum wage would be frozen at $14 per hour. They eliminated 3 legislative offices including the Environmental Commissioner of Ontario (ECO), child and youth advocate and French language services commissioner positions. The surtax on the highest earning Ontarians that would have generated about $275 million in revenue, was cancelled. The proposed French language university was cancelled as were three university satellite campuses.

Fedeli served as minister until he was moved to economic development in June 2019 in a major cabinet shuffle. According to CTV News Queen's Park Bureau Chief, Colin D'Mello, Premier Ford removed Fedeli as Finance Minister on June 20, 2019 in the "wake of a disastrous budget rollout that's left the Progressive Conservative government drowning in negative publicity."

Minister Fedeli tabled the Ford government's first budget on April 11, 2019. According to the Sault Star, Fedeli was demoted from "highly-touted finance post" and "blamed" for the "failure to sell voters on the $163.4-billion budget and the cost of breaking a 10-year deal that ultimately expands beer and wine sales in grocery stores, costing taxpayers $1 billion." NDP Timiskaming-Cochrane MPP, John Vanthof, said that the 2019 budget failed northern Ontario by not providing funds for Highway 69, the Ring of Fire, expanded broadband access, and cuts to Indigenous Affairs, Ministry of Natural Resources, the Ministry of Agriculture, Food, and Rural Affairs, and more. Vanthof said that there "will be beer in corner stores, drinks at 9 in the morning, tailgate parties, and blue licence plates, but when the fog is cleared, there is also an over $500 million cut to the Ministry of Northern Development and Mines."

In the fiscal year 2019, the publicly funded Legal Aid Ontario will receive $133 million less than previously, representing a funding cut of 30 per cent, as part of the Ford government's deficit-cutting plan, presented in the April 2019 budget. On September 11, 2019, Chief Justice of Ontario George Strathy said that the "cuts to Legal Aid Ontario will force many people to self-represent...What we judges can say is that reducing legal representation for the most vulnerable members of society does not save money. It increases trial times, places greater demands on public services, and ultimately delays and increases the cost of legal proceedings for everyone."

==== Budget deficit ====
From about 1989 to 2018, Ontario has reported a deficit almost every year; the province's net debt increased to approximately $311.6 billion (by October 2018); and Ontario's net debt‐to‐GDP ratio grew from 13.4% to about 40.5% in 2018–19.

According to an April 11, 2018 Royal Bank of Canada (RBC) report, which was based on figures provided by the Ford government, the revised estimate of Ontario's deficit was $11.7 billion in 2018–2019 and it was projected to decrease by $1.4 billion in 2019–2020 mainly because of "the removal of the $1 billion contingency reserve." At that time, it was projected that the deficit would be "completely eliminated in 2023–2024 with a small surplus of $0.3 billion." By October 2019, the Financial Accountability Officer, Weltman, said that the FAO had been in error when they—and the Ford government—had projected a $11.7-billion deficit that was reported in the spring 2019 budget.

By June 2018, Ontario had "Canada's second-highest public debt per person and a growing budget deficit", according to The Economist.

In October 2018, the Ontario Finance Department reported that Ontario's public debt per person, at $23,014, had surpassed that of Quebec at $21,606 in the fiscal year 2017–2018. Newfoundland and Labrador's public debt per capita, at $27,761, was the highest in Canada.

By 2019, the Ontario Chamber of Commerce reported that Ontario's debt was over $348 billion—representing about 41% of provincial GDP of almost $850 billion. Ontario's GDP is much larger than any of the other provinces and is almost half of Canada's GDP. "When combined with the federal debt (approximately $680 billion), the debt-to-GDP ratio for Ontarians nears 80 percent."

In October 2019, the Financial Accountability Office said that the deficit had increased from $ 3.7 billion in 2017—at the end of the Liberal administration—to $7.4 billion in 2018 under Premier Ford. The deficit had almost doubled partly because of "cancelled climate-change initiatives and subsidizing hydro bills" according to the Hamilton Spectator.

The government's 2025 budget reported a $14.6 billion deficit; in 2026, the Ford government's budget deficit was nearly double what was projected in 2025, reaching $13.8 billion.

==== Economic Development and trade ====
Minister Smith tabled Bill 47: Making Ontario Open for Business Act, 2018, which was passed on November 21, 2018. According to the Toronto Sun, Bill 47 strips "part-time workers of two paid sick days a year and prevent[s] a rise in the minimum wage to $15 an hour on January 1, 2019." NDP critic said that this "will incent employers to turn full-time positions into cheaper part-time work".

The Ontario government abruptly cut all its annual provincial funding to the Ontario Institute for Regenerative Medicine (OIRM)—$5 million—in May 2019. Minister Smith, said that the "private sector will step up and fund stem-cell research." Scientists told CBC that the private sector will only invest in the stem-cell field when "their studies reach a late phase"; until then, "government funding is crucial." OIRM scientists who are "working on treatment of premature babies" said the cuts were "extremely short-sighted and uninformed".

In June 2019, Vic Fedeli was appointed as Minister of Economic Development, Job Creation and Trade. Prabmeet Sarkaria is Associate Minister of Small Business and Red Tape Reduction in the economic development ministry. Michael Parsa and Donna Skelly were appointed as Parliamentary Assistants to the Minister of Economic Development, Job Creation, and Trade (Trade) in June 2018.

==== MPP salary increase and pension re-introduction ====
In 2025, Ford's government introduced legislation to grant MPPs a 35 per cent pay raise. Previously, an MPP earned $116,550 annually, which had not changed since 2009. With support from the other parties, the Legislature enacted the MPP Pension and Compensation Act, 2025, which increased MPPs' salaries to $157,350, ministers from $165,851 to $223,909, and the premier from $208,974 to $282,129. The change also re-introduced pensions for MPPs.

=== Transparency ===
Cabinet mandate letters requested by the Canadian Broadcasting Corporation through a freedom of information request were not released to the public, despite being ordered to by the Ontario information and privacy commissioner in 2019. The Supreme Court of Canada held the mandate letters issued by Doug Ford to his ministers were protected from disclosure under access to information legislation, under the principle of Cabinet confidentiality.

In 2026, the government announced changes to Ontario's existing freedom of information (FOI) laws, restricting access to government records from the premier's office, Cabinet ministers, and parliamentary assistants. The legislation faced backlash from opposition parties and Ontario's privacy commissioner.

=== Fixed election dates ===
Ford's government announced a proposal on October 27, 2025, to eliminate fixed election dates as part of a series of changes to provincial election law in order to "return Ontario to an electoral process that served our province well... prior to the imposition of American-style fixed election dates." The bill removing fixed election dates received royal assent and went into effect on November 27.

=== Trump tariffs ===
In January 2025, Ford began to state that he would need a "clear mandate" from voters to respond to the tariffs on Canadian imports to the United States threatened by new President Donald Trump, calling the 2025 Ontario general election. Ford was caught on video saying that on the day of the 2024 U.S. presidential election he was "100% happy" that Trump won, until Trump threatened tariffs on Canada. During the election campaign, his party promised to invest $10 billion in cash-flow support for Ontario employers, $3 billion in payroll tax and premium relief, $120 million to support approximately 18,000 bars and restaurants, $40 million for a new Trade-Impacted Communities Program, $300 million to expand the Ontario Made Manufacturing Investment Tax Credit, and $600 million for the Invest Ontario Fund. Ford also advised the new Prime Minister, Mark Carney, on strategies to mitigate the trade war, and appeared on multiple American news shows. After being re-elected to a third term in 2025, the government passed The Protect Ontario Through Free Trade Within Canada Act, 2025, which removed internal barriers to trade in goods, among other changes. In October 2025, Ford launched an ad campaign in the United States criticizing the tariffs. The ad featured a clip of Ronald Reagan from 1987 warning against the economic impact of trade wars.

=== Transportation ===
On April 10, 2019, Premier Ford and Minister Yurek announced Ontario's transit plan for the Greater Toronto Area (GTA)—one of the largest metropolitan areas in Canada. The $30 billion dollar project would include the $10.9 billion Ontario Line, the $5.5 billion Scarborough subway extension, the $5.6 billion Yonge North subway extension to Richmond Hill, and the $4.7 billion Eglinton West extension. The province would provide $11.2 billion in funding and "wants to own the lines but leave the city and TTC to operate the subway system." Premier Ford said, "We are making the biggest and largest investment in new subways in Canadian history." The City of Toronto had already spent $224 million of public money on its own "planning and design of transit infrastructure in Toronto." The City raised concerns about delays considering the city manager—Chris Murray's "sweeping" April 16 transit expansion report, "which also suggests several projects may now be in limbo, including two Scarborough transit lines and Mayor John Tory's signature SmartTrack plan."

In a December 13, 2018, City Council meeting, Toronto Transit Commission (TTC) CEO Rick Leary, said that he had not had any "direct negotiations or discussion" with the province on what "it would look like if the province uploaded the subway system"—bringing the "TTC's subway system under provincial ownership". While there were clear financial benefits to the city, the council voted to "reaffirm their desire to keep the entire TTC — subways and all" and requested more clarity from the province. The studies and plans for the TTC's proposed "desperately needed extension known as the Relief Line", had begun in the late 2010s. By early 2019, the planning for the Relief Line was "well underway and construction was scheduled to begin in 2020, with projected completion in 2029." In April 2019, Ford put the Relief Line project on hold in favour of the Ontario Line, which would use a different route with significant lengths of at-grade or elevated track.

On September 25, 2024, Ford promised to build a traffic tunnel under the Highway 401 to relieve congestion, and campaigned on constructing the Bradford Bypass.

On October 21, 2024, Ford tabled a bill, titled the Reducing Gridlock, Saving You Time Act, granting the province authority to remove bike lanes from several arterial roads in Toronto, as well as expedite the construction of Highway 413. The bill would also require municipalities to get provincial approval before replacing any automotive lanes with bike lanes. Toronto City Council formally opposed the plan, citing an estimated cost of $48 million to remove the bike lanes on Bloor, Avenue, and Yonge. On November 21, Ford's government made several amendments to the bill which the opposition claimed would protect the province from liability if a cyclist were injured or killed due to the removal of the lanes. The bill passed on November 25, 2024. Ford's bill has faced opposition from local politicians and cycling advocates on grounds of provincial overreach and potential safety impacts to cyclists. Toronto City Council has announced its intention to challenge the bill on legal grounds. In July 2025, an Ontario court ruled that removing Toronto bike lanes was unconstitutional; the government will appeal the decision. In August 2026, the Ontario appeals court ruled that there is no constitutional obligation to regulate the use of roads in any particular manner, allowing Ford's government to remove Toronto bike lanes.

In 2025, automated speed enforcement fell under controversy. The Kathleen Wynne Liberal government introduced legislation allowing automated speed enforcement in 2017, before the Ford government passed it in 2019. By October 2025, Ford announced legislation that would ban the use of speed cameras, calling them "cash grabs". The move came after many speed cameras in Toronto were vandalized. Over 20 mayors, including Olivia Chow of Toronto, spoke out against the proposed legislation, as well as municipalities, school boards, and police chiefs. On November 14, the Building a More Competitive Economy Act was passed, that struck the section of the Highway Traffic Act that permitted automated speed enforcement. Instead, the government launched a $210 million road safety initiatives fund for municipalities to implement traffic calming measures.

His government has also reinstated the Northlander passenger train service and has broken ground on the East Harbour Transit Hub. Ford also expanded GO Transit services. In 2026, the government introduced the Building Homes and Improving Transportation Infrastructure Act, which seeks to do, among other things, "harmonize" transit fares across the Greater Toronto and Hamilton Area by requiring agencies to adopt a single unified fare structure. The legislation will also increase penalties for fare evaders. Ford had previously implemented changes called "One Fare", which makes transit riders only pay once when transferring between the TTC and GO Transit, Brampton Transit, Durham Region Transit, MiWay, and York Region Transit. In March 2026, it was announced that the municipal, provincial, and federal governments would fund the Waterfront East LRT project.

=== Social services ===
On November 15, 2018, the government announced it was eliminating three watchdog legislative offices, including the child and youth advocate.

One of the biggest cuts, announced in the 2019 budget, was the $1 billion cut—over four years—to the Ministry of Community and Social Services.

In February 2019, the government had announced changes to the Ontario Autism Program, which had over 20,000 children on a waiting list. Under Minister MacLeod and Fee, changes were made in "how children qualified, based on age and family income". During the revamping of the Program, support for children already receiving service, was clawed back which meant that families had to pay most of the bills for "very expensive behavioural therapies." This "outraged those in the autism community". The protests included a "huge rally at Queen's Park that could be heard inside the legislature and inundated Tory MPPs and Social Services Minister Lisa MacLeod with complaints." In response, the Ford government "scrambled to pour more money into the program and in early May [2019] announced consultations that would help shape further reforms to the system, moving toward one based on need." The Hamilton Spectator said that of all the "policy snafus", the funding of services for families of children with autism, was the one that bothered Ford the most.

On August 8, 2019, the Ford government severed the funding for court-ordered autism services for eight families with adult children with "severe" conditions who are at "serious risk of harm", who had been receiving the funding since 2004. Lawyers Scott Hutchison and Mary Eberts served notice of intent to sue in an 18-page letter to Social Services Minister Smith and Premier Ford "for breach of contract, negligence, and breach of Charter rights." It was formally filed in court on October 1. Those long-standing payments of about $1.7 million annually were the result of litigation against the previous provincial administrations, who had committed to continue the funding "until a co-ordinated transition to other services had been made, in a way that provided alternative services with which the families were satisfied", according to The Star. Faced with a backlash against "a botched revamp of autism services" in February 2019, the government had doubled the annual funding to $600 million for autism services but this did not restore the funding for these eight families.

==== Bill 124 ====
In 2019, the government passed Bill 124, which limited public sector salary increases to one percent for each of the next three years. After a legal challenge from unions, it was struck down as unconstitutional in November 2022 by the Ontario Superior Court of Justice, a decision upheld by the Court of Appeal for Ontario in February 2024. Afterwards, Premier Ford said that the law would be repealed.

=== Healthcare ===
In July 2018, Premier Ford named Rueben Devlin, an orthopedic surgeon who was CEO of Toronto's Humber River Hospital and a "key Tory adviser" and former Ontario PCs president—to a $348,000 a year three-year appointment on the Council on Improving Healthcare and Ending Hallway Medicine, to curb hospital overcrowding. Devlin is the Ford family's "closest health-care adviser." Health costs in Ontario were over $60 billion annually, according to TVO's Steve Paikin. Devlin is tasked with the selection of the other Council members, and with "ending hallway medicine, dental care for seniors, improved mental-health services), all while ensuring stable, long-term funding for the system—Premier Ford's election promises.

Since coming into power in June 2018, Premier Ford's government put an approved injection site in Toronto—and several other places—on pause while Health Minister Christine Elliott studied the issue.

In February 2019, the Ontario NDP said that two sets of leaked documents show that the Ford government was creating a health "super agency" that "would be in charge of managing health services, quality improvement, patient relations, digital health and tissue donation and transplants, among other responsibilities." The documents said that "long-term care inspections" and the Ontario's "air ambulance service" Ornge would be "outsourced". According to a CTV News report, Minister Elliot was "forced to make assurances" that these services would not be "privatized". The first document, which was leaked at the end of January, was a "draft version of the Progressive Conservative government's upcoming health-care transformation legislation." CTV News said "local health integration networks, Cancer Care Ontario, eHealth Ontario, the Trillium Gift of Life Network and other government health agencies" would be "rolled into" the super agency. Minister Elliot said that the December 13 assistant deputy ministers workshop document, which made references to outsourcing laboratories, "inspections, licensing, devices" and Ornge, were options and that these services would not be privatized. The NDP said that the super agency was described in the leaked documents as having the "competency and capacity to effectively partner with public and private sector entities." The documents show that MyCare groups is being created as a "new model" of "integrated care delivery" with the goal of providing "patients with seamless, co-ordinated care and a single team of providers for all their care needs."

Ontario Health Minister Christine Elliot tabled the controversial Bill 74: The People's Health Care Act. Its first reading was on February 26, 2019, and it received Royal Assent on April 18, 2019.

In spite of 2018 election promises that "not a single person will lose their job" under his PC government, Ontario Health Minister Christine Elliot office announced in June 2019 that 416 workers would be laid off, as 20 health agencies, including 14 local health integration networks (LHINs), Cancer Care Ontario, eHealth Ontario were merged into one new super-agency called Ontario Health. With the merger "another 409 vacant positions will be eliminated." These changes are estimated to save "$350 million a year by 2021–22". A CBC News report said that the average wait times in Ontario hospitals set a new June record of an average of 16.3 hours waiting in emergency rooms in 2019, compared to 14.4 hours in June 2018, based on Health Quality Ontario data. More restructuring was announced by the Health ministry in September and no more job losses are anticipated.

On November 18, 2024, Ford's government tabled a bill to ban supervised injection sites from operating within 200 meters of a school or child-care centre. The bill would also require municipalities to get approval from the provincial health minister and federal government before launching new facilities. In a news conference for the bill, Health Minister Sylvia Jones stated, "I want to be very clear, there will be no further safe injection sites in the province of Ontario under our government."

=== Education ===
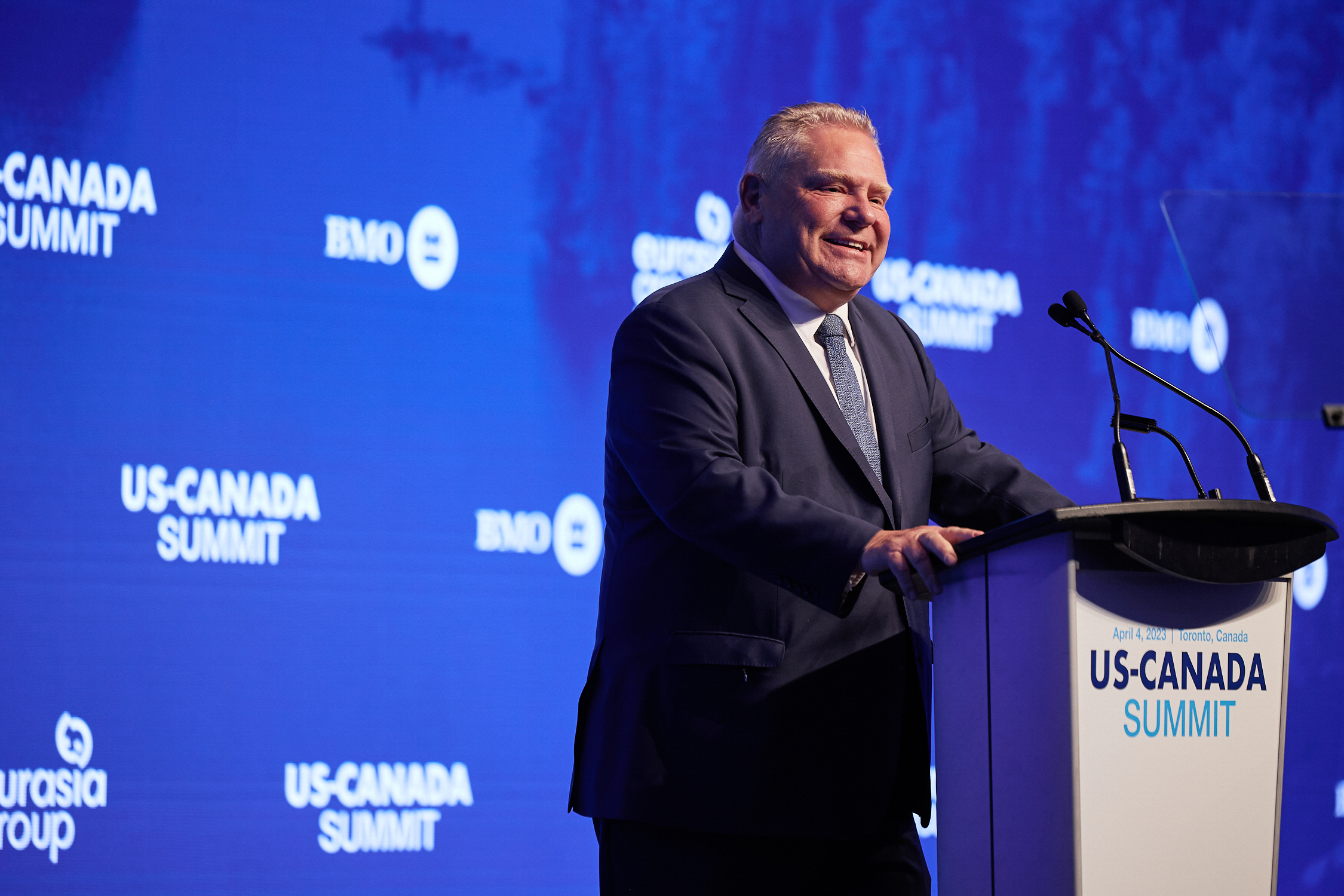
Ford speaks at an event

In early July 2018, then Education Minister, Lisa Thompson, told Queen's Park reporters that starting in September 2018, Ontario schools would no longer be using the sex education curriculum in use since 2015, but would be reverting to the previous curriculum. One of the election campaign promises by the Ford government was to "scrap" the 2015 sex education curriculum. Premier Ford's government said that "it did not order the cancellation." By August 2019, the Ministry of Education, following "widespread consultations," made "only minor tweaks". The "health lesson plan being brought to schools in the fall" of 2019 "is similar to the one Ford crusaded against."

On October 11, 2019, Minister Lecce reached a deal with CUPE school support workers, which has to be ratified by CUPE members and averted a pending strike. Premier Ford had said that he would cap "all public sector wage settlements at one per cent per year". The three-year agreement with CUPE was for a "one per cent wage increase annually for the duration of deal." A clause in the agreement clause in the agreement says that if "higher increases are negotiated by other education unions", their union will be able to increase to more than one percent. CUPE also had $58.3 million restored for the "hiring of educational assistants" with an additional $20 million for hiring "more custodians and clerical workers." As well, CUPE's sick leave provisions remained untouched.

In August 2018, in response to "incidents on campuses across North America where speakers faced protests", then Minister Fullerton announced that all "publicly-assisted" colleges and universities were required to "develop and publicly post its own free speech policy by January 1, 2019". The policy must meet a "minimum standard specified by the government." These standards must include the Chicago principles. Higher Education Quality Council of Ontario (HEQCO) has the authority to gather the mandatory self-reporting by colleges and universities and to monitor colleges and institutions for compliance. An article in The Hamilton Spectator cited examples of protests against controversial speakers in Ontario, such as Jordan Peterson, a University of Toronto professor and Lindsay Shepherd, who was disciplined after showing a Peterson video to her students at Wilfrid Laurier University. Fullerton said that free speech had become a campaign issue. She said the government was "constantly" hearing from students and faculty "that free speech was being stifled on Ontario campuses."

Ford's government introduced Bill 28, known as the Keeping Students in Class Act, which was passed by the Legislative Assembly of Ontario on November 3, 2022, amid ongoing labour negotiations with the Canadian Union of Public Employees (CUPE). CUPE had given notice of job action October 30 after negotiations broke down with the Ministry of Education, and would have been in a legal strike position on November 4. Bill 28 imposes a contract on CUPE, and makes it illegal to strike, setting fines of $4000 for workers. The bill invokes the notwithstanding clause, shielding it from being struck down by the courts by allowing the bill to operate despite the right to collective bargaining granted by the Canadian Charter of Rights and Freedoms. The legislation was widely condemned, including by opposition parties, the Canadian Civil Liberties Association, Prime Minister Justin Trudeau, Minister of Justice and Attorney General of Canada David Lametti, the Ontario Bar Association, and other unions including those which had previously endorsed the PC Party.

Despite the government's bill, CUPE went on strike anyway, resulting in province-wide school closures and protests in support of education workers. The government challenged CUPE at the Ontario Labour Relations Board. On November 7, 2022, Ford announced that he would rescind Bill 28 and that he would resume negotiations with CUPE. Following the strike, Ford said he did not regret his use of the notwithstanding clause in imposing the contract and said that it helped both sides "come to their senses".

Following Paul Calandra's appointment as minister of education in 2025, he began appointing supervisors to take over several of Ontario's school boards. The government's Bill 33 would give the education ministry more power over school boards. In early 2026, Calandra announced the "Putting Student Achievement First Act," which includes many education reforms. The bill reduced the number of elected trustees to a minimum of 12, changed the responsibilities of trustees, and introduced the position of school board chief executive officer. To reduce student absenteeism among secondary school students, the bill makes attendance and participation part of students' final marks and introduces written final exams.

==== Ontario Student Assistance Program ====
In early 2026, the Ford government announced changes to the Ontario Student Assistance Program (OSAP) and billions in new funding for Ontario's financially struggling colleges and universities. The government announced the end of the tuition freeze for public colleges and universities, allowing them to raise fees by up to two percent per year over three years, and announced changes to OSAP funding, with grants reduced to a maximum of 25 percent for grants, and loans increased to a minimum of 75 percent; the changes saw protests from students across the province. This followed changes made to the program by the government in January 2019, which included a 10% tuition fee reduction for all programs in 2019–20, followed by a freeze in 2020–21, and the cutting of the OSAP budget from $2 billion to $1.4 billion.

=== Public safety ===
Ford came under fire in December 2018 by Ontario Provincial Police (OPP) Deputy Commissioner Brad Blair, who claimed Ford requested the OPP “purchase a large camper-type vehicle ... modified to specifications the premier's office would provide” and keep the costs “off the books.” The vehicle was intended for the premier to use for work, and reportedly was asked to include a swivel chair. The accusation followed on the heels of Ford appointing a longtime family friend to be the next OPP commissioner just days after lowering the requirements for the position.

In response to increasing calls for one, Ford has stated he opposes a ban on handguns in Ontario.

Ford opposes supervised drug injection sites.

The Ford government passed The Protect Ontario Through Safer Streets and Stronger Communities Act, 2025, which introduced several changes, including: more special constables will be able to carry firearms, police will be given more powers to investigate cases of human trafficking, there will be stronger penalties for vehicle theft, more support for victims of human trafficking and violent crime, changes to bail laws, more appointed judges, more funding for community safety programs, and implemented mandatory drug addiction treatment options instead of, or alongside, traditional sentences.

=== Francophone Affairs ===
Mulroney voted in support of the Ford government's September 2018 proposal to use Section 33 of the Canadian Charter of Rights and Freedoms, commonly called the "notwithstanding clause", to overrule a judge's decision that legislation intended to shrink the size of Toronto City Council was in fact in violation of Charter rights. For this position, she faced widespread condemnation from constitutional experts and politicians of all parties, particularly with respect to her duty to ensure the sanctity of the judicial process as Attorney General.

In November 2018, Ford announced cuts which included cancelling a "French language university and cut the post of provincial commissioner for French language affairs." Ontario's francophone population represents from 550,000 to 744,000 people in a province of 14 million, according to The New York Times with many concentrated in Sudbury, Ontario, in northern Ontario and near the Ontario-Quebec border in eastern Ontario.

The Ford government again came under criticism from the Franco-Ontarian community for its perceived inaction during the 2021 Laurentian University Financial Crisis and its support of the large cuts to the university.

=== Indigenous Affairs ===
In the April 2019 budget, funding for the Ministry of Indigenous Affairs was cut in half.

Minister Rickford released a May 9, 2019 statement saying that the Ontario Government was "committed to do everything in its authority to support the relocation" of the Kashechewan First Nation. which is located north of Fort Albany, Ontario on the James Bay coast. The community has had flooding and infrastructure problems for many years and in April 2019, had to evacuate 2,500 members by plane when a state of emergency was called again. APTN reported, in the presence of 300 community members, both the federal and provincial governments signed the Framework Agreement with Kashechewan First Nation to commit to moving the reserve. The federal Minister of Indigenous Services Seamus O'Regan said the relocation process would probably take about eight years to complete.

=== Northern Development and Mines ===
A July 7, 2018 article in Policy Options said that newly elected Premier Ford had said that "resource development within Northern Ontario's Ring of Fire mining area [would] be a priority for his government."

In Verner, Ontario on September 17, 2019, Premier Ford told the press that the Ring of Fire development "remains a top priority for the Progressive Conservative government." The development project is located in the remote, mineral-rich James Bay Lowlands of Northern Ontario, in the Kenora District, approximately 400 kilometres (250 miles) northeast of Thunder Bay. In August, Greg Rickford, who is Ontario's Minister of Energy, Northern Development and Mines (MENDM), said that the Ford government was dissolving the 2014 regional framework agreement between the nine Matawa First Nations and the province. By September, Rickford said that they were working with individual communities on a transportation corridor that Rickford called a "corridor to prosperity" from the Ring of Fire—Ring of Fire as a "major economic opportunity"—to transportation hubs in the south.

However, the 2019 budget cut more than $500 million to the Ministry of Northern Development and Mines.

=== First Nations relations ===
In March 2021, Ford publicly accused MPP Sol Mamakwa of "jumping the line" to receive his second dose of a COVID-19 vaccine, despite being eligible to receive it. Mamakwa went to his riding to receive the vaccine as an attempt to prevent vaccine hesitancy amongst his constituents. On Thursday, March 11, 2021, Ford apologised for his remark and later said he "got a little personal" when throwing the accusation at Mamakwa. Mamakwa did not say that he accepted Ford's apology but stated that he appreciated the call from Ford.

In September 2021, an Ontario judge issued an injunction on mining in Wiisinin Zaahgi'igan (an area sacred to the Ginoogaming First Nation peoples). The judge ruled that the Ontario government did not consult with the Ginoogaming as is their constitutional duty.

Ford's 2024 Reducing Gridlock, Saving you Time Act removed the requirement for future Indigenous consultation for the upcoming Highway 413 in a possible contravention of Ontario's Environmental Assessment Act. In addition, the Indigenous consultation period for the bill was only 30 days, decried by the regional chief as 'too short'.

Many Indigenous and environmental advocacy groups opposed his government's Protecting Ontario by Unleashing Our Economy Act, or Bill 5, which gives Ford's cabinet the ability to create special economic zones and exempt companies or projects from having to comply with any provincial law, provincial regulation or municipal bylaw. Ford also apologized for saying that First Nations "keep coming hat in hand" for government money in June 2025.

=== Energy ===
In July 2018, Minister Rickford tabled Bill 2: Urgent Priorities Act, which received Royal Assent in the same month. The first session of the 42nd Legislature was on July 11 and Bill 2, which passed into law on July 25, was the Ford Government's first piece of legislation. Bill 2—an omnibus bill—was "criticized by both "business groups and unions". It legislated an end to the strike between York University and Canadian Union of Public Employees (CUPE), cancelled the White Pines Wind Project wind farm contract, and gave Ontario government "veto power over compensation at Hydro One."

In December 2025, Ford and New York governor Kathy Hochul signed a memorandum of understanding which makes the New York Power Authority and Ontario Power Generation work together on advancing nuclear energy technology.

In July 2026, Ford and Alberta premier Danielle Smith proposed an oil pipeline from Alberta to Sarnia, Ontario.

==== Small modular reactors ====
In November 2020, Ontario Power Generation (OPG) announced plans to build a small modular reactor (SMR) at Darlington Nuclear Generating Station. OPG will work with GE Vernova Hitachi Nuclear Canada to build the SMR.

On December 2, 2022, Ontario Power Generation officially broke ground on the Darlington SMR (Darlington B) project. The first unit to be constructed is a GVH BWRX-300 unit.

Construction started in May 2025, with the reactor expected to come online in 2030.

==== Hydro One ====
On July 25, 2018, the Ford government passed Bill 2, which "put a severe dent into the operations of Hydro One", a former Crown corporation which went public in November 2015. The Toronto-based Hydro One is the province's "largest electricity transmission and distribution service provider" with "nearly 1.4 million customers". Hydro One was established under the Business Corporations Act Crown corporation under the Government of Ontario. Bill 2 places a cap on the compensation allowed for executive members of the board of directors, and gave Ford's provincial government a "direct say in the naming of directors" representing a major shift from what was agreed upon between shareholders and the government when Hydro One went public three years earlier. Under Premier Ford, the CEO and the entire board of directors were replaced. The former CEO, Mayo Schmidt was replaced by Tim Hodgson, a Ford appointee, who took on his new position in August 2019 with an annual salary of $120,000. Hydro One was in the process of acquiring American energy firm Avista Inc., when "U.S. regulators scuttled" the purchase "costing the Toronto-based company a $140 million termination penalty." The Washington Utilities and Transportation Commission said that they blocked the purchase of Avista because of concerns about the independence of Hydro One from the Ontario provincial government. Reducing Ontario consumer electricity costs by 12% was one of the campaign promises made by the Conservative Party. government had promised to cut consumers' electricity prices 12%. By July 2019, this has not happened, according to The Record. Critics raised concerns that Hydro One will not experience stability as Premier Ford's government has a "record of reaching in to exert control."

On March 21, 2019, Minister Rickford tabled Bill 87, the Fixing the Hydro Mess Act, which was given royal assent on May 9. Bill 87 overhauled the Ontario Energy Board and eliminated the Liberal's 2017 Fair Hydro Plan which the PC's said would save $442 million. The Liberal Plan "subsidized electricity with borrowed money" in response to a "public outcry over soaring hydro rates, particularly in rural areas." The Liberals created the Ontario Power Generation Inc (OPG Trust) as the Financial Services Manager to manage the debt. Bonnie Lysyk, the Auditor General, released a special report on October 17, 2017, which said the "structure of the plan" was in violation of the provincial government's accounting rules. She said that the Plan, which committed the government to discount consumer electricity rates for ten years, would cost the province "$21 billion in interest over the next 30 years." The 2017 AG report said that it would cost $4 billion more on the $18.4 billion loan to use the Ontario Power Generation (OPG Trust) than if the province took out the loan because the province would have a lower interest rate than the OPG Trust. The Ford government said that they would maintain [the] 25 per cent time-of-use rates, that was part of the Liberal's Fair Hydro Plan. Under the newly structured Conservative plan, the debt financing "would move onto the government's books" from the OPG trust.

=== Provincial–municipal relations ===
In September 2018, Ford announced that he would use the Canadian Charter of Rights and Freedoms' "notwithstanding" clause to override the ruling of a Superior Court judge which said that Ford's legislation, decreasing the size of Toronto City Council just before the municipal election, was unconstitutional. As Ontario's AG, Mulroney voted in support of the Ford government's use of Section 33 of the Canadian Charter of Rights and Freedoms. According to the Globe and Mail, "constitutional experts and politicians of all parties" criticized her decision as a violation of the sanctity of the judicial process as Attorney General.

In October 2020, the Ford government passed the Supporting Ontario’s Recovery Act, 2020, which included a section that banned municipalities in the province from using ranked ballots for their mayoral and city council elections. The move came as multiple cities in the province were planning to switch from first-past-the-post to ranked ballots for the 2022 local elections.

In 2022, the government passed the Strong Mayors, Building Homes Act, which granted extra powers to the mayor of Toronto and the mayors of other designated municipalities within their mayor–council governments.

The Ford government's Better Regional Governance Act, 2026 gives the province power to appoint chairs/wardens in many regional governments, including in Peel Region, the Regional Municipality of Durham, the Waterloo Regional Municipality, and the Regional Municipality of York. The government also announced the reduction of regional seats in Simcoe County and Niagara Region.

==== Toronto City Council ====
The Ford government passed the Better Local Government Act into law on August 14, 2018. Premier Ford announced the controversial bill on September 27, on the last day for candidate registration for the October 22, 2018 Toronto municipal election, newly elected Premier of Ontario Doug Ford introduced the Better Local Government Act (Bill 5) which requires that Toronto use the same ridings for all its elections—municipal, provincial, and federal—effectively reducing the Toronto City Council from 47 seats to 25. Bill 5 passed on August 14, 2018. Toronto is Ontario's capital city and the largest city in Canada with a population of 2.7 million. The number of Council seats had just been expanded following approximately four years of consultations and debates. Ford said that these reductions would lower the cost to taxpayers by $CDN 25 ($USD19.1) million dollars in Toronto's $CDN11.1 ($USD8.5) billion dollar budget. Bill 5 reset the positions of regional municipality chairs as by appointment not be election in Peel, York, Niagara and Muskoka.

=== Housing ===
In March 2026, Ford and Carney announced that they would each spend $4.4 billion in order to cut development charges to spur housing construction.

==== Bill 23, More Homes Built Faster Act, 2022 ====
Minister Clark introduced Bill 23, the More Homes Built Faster Act, 2022, an omnibus bill intended to increase Ontario's housing supply that was described as "one of Premier Ford's largest pieces of legislation" to date. Bill 23 would make sweeping changes affecting nine laws and "every aspect of planning and development" in the province. By November 25, Ford announced a rollback of some of Bill 23's most controversial changes to existing statutes that would have undermined environmental concerns.

=== Environment ===
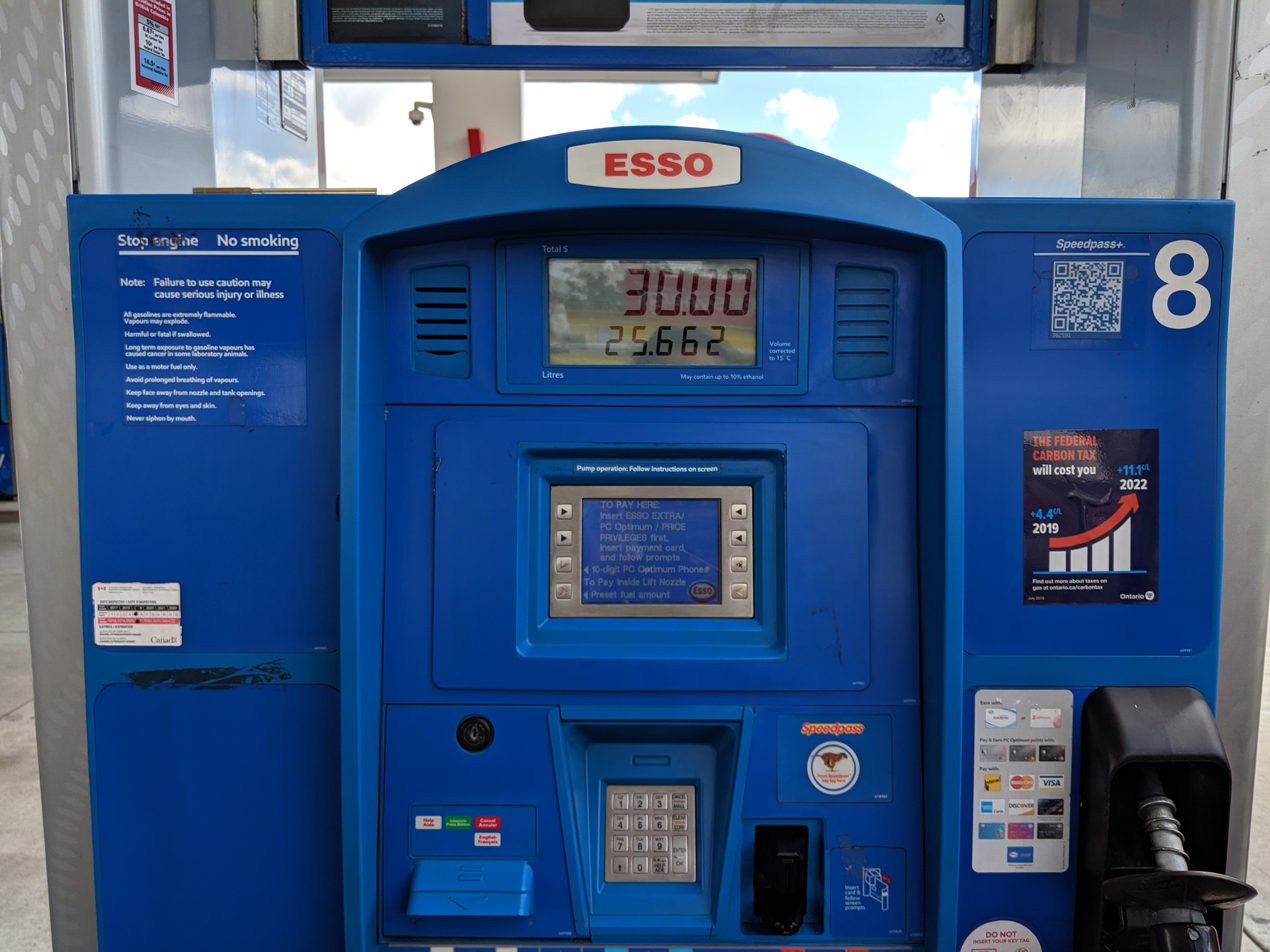
Carbon tax decals on gas pumps in Ontario, mandated by the Ford government during the 2019 Canadian federal election.

On June 7, after winning the election, Ford said that the "very first item" on his agenda would be to cancel the federal carbon tax and provincial cap-and-trade programs in order to prevent motorists from being "gouged at the pumps".

According to a June 28, 2018 article in The Economist, Ontario, with "Canada's second-highest public debt per person and a growing budget deficit", Ford's "poleaxing of cap and trade" would result in C$2.8bn worth of pollution permits owned by companies that could result in lawsuits. The article said that Ontario would lose C$2bn a year from the sale of pollution permits under its cap-and-trade program, which represents 1.3% of Ontario's revenue.

In November 2018, the Ford government announced that it was eliminating three provincial watchdog groups, including the Environmental Commissioner of Ontario (ECO), to cut costs. Then Environmental Commissioner of Ontario (ECO), Dianne Saxe, had just submitted her 4-volume, 339-page 2018 Environmental Protection Report, entitled "Back to Basics, to the Legislative Assembly of Ontario. Saxe was a "vocal critic" of the Ford government's "actions on climate change"—"their vow to fight a federal carbon tax, pulling out of more than 700 renewable energy contracts and moving to end the Ontario Green Energy Act."

Bill 57, also known as the Restoring Trust, Transparency and Accountability Act transferred the Environmental Commissioner Officer's duties to the Auditor General of Ontario.

Ford's government withdrew the province from the Western Climate Initiative emissions trading system, which had been implemented by the previous Liberal government.

=== Infrastructure ===
As Minister, McNaughton introduced Bill 32, the Access to Natural Gas Act, in the fall of 2018. It was passed into law that December. Bill 32 was intended to make it possible to expand access to natural gas throughout rural and Northern Ontario, including First Nations communities.

Premier Ford said in a statement released on September 17, 2018, that "cancelling the cap-and-trade carbon tax" had caused the price of natural gas to decrease in Ontario. Premier Ford announced the new legislation and explained how it differed from the previous government's 2017 taxpayer-funded $100 million Natural Gas Grant Program—through which—according to Premier Ford, "private sector companies were limited from participating in natural gas expansion, portions of which were instead managed by the [Natural Gas Grant Program]." Bill 32, the Access to Natural Gas Act passed into law in 2018 to "encourage more private gas distributors to partner with communities to develop projects that expand access to affordable and efficient natural gas."

On September 18, 2018, the city of North Bay learned that the Natural Gas Grant Program funding of over $8.6 million had been cancelled for a natural gas project that would have extended "services to as many as 350 homes in the north shore area of Trout Lake."

In January 2019, Minister McNaughton announced that the Ford government would provide $27 million to Northeast Midstream towards the construction of their Nipigon LNG gas plant. The plant would be capable of converting natural gas into a liquid form that can be trucked to consumers. The project will create between 700 and 2,800 jobs in the region.

In May 2019, Minister McNaughton announced that the Ontario government "committed up to $63.7 million" to Southwestern Integrated Fibre Technology (SWIFT) with support from other levels of government. The not-for-profit, publicly-funded SWIFT project to develop a regional fibre optic network, has been one of the key initiatives of the Western Ontario Wardens' Caucus (WOWC) representing upper-tier municipalities in southern Ontario from Dufferin to Windsor. Through SWIFT, federal, provincial and local municipalities "subsidize the construction of an open-access, high-speed broadband network in Southwestern Ontario, Caledon and the Niagara Region."

In December 2025, Ford and Niagara Falls mayor Jim Diodati announced a new tourism strategy for the city, including expanded transportation and entertainment offerings such as new "attractions, gaming, wine and restaurants, and arts and culture."

In early 2026, Ford announced plans to build a new 2-million square foot convention centre in Toronto, replacing the Metro Toronto Convention Centre. He later also announced plans to take control of the Billy Bishop Toronto City Airport to expand its runway and allow jets at the island airport, a suggestion immediately supported by the Toronto Port Authority. Expansion remains opposed by local Councillors, local community associations and the "NoJetsTo" and "Parks Not Planes" advocacy groups.

==== Bill 5 ====
Many Indigenous and environmental advocacy groups opposed his government's Protecting Ontario by Unleashing Our Economy Act, or Bill 5, which gives Ford's cabinet the ability to create special economic zones and exempt companies or projects from having to comply with any provincial law, provincial regulation or municipal bylaw. Ford also apologized for saying that First Nations "keep coming hat in hand" for government money in June 2025.

==== Ontario Place ====
In July 2021, development plans for the shuttered Ontario Place venue in Toronto were announced. Two companies are to redevelop different sectors:

- LiveNation (which already operates music venues at the site) will revamp the Budweiser Stage Amphitheatre into an indoor/outdoor facility with a capacity of up to 20,000 people in the summer and nearly 9,000 in winter.
- Austrian company Therme Group will develop the west island. A new large facility will cover most of the island. The facility will include indoor and outdoor pools, a spa, waterslides, restaurants, and a botanical garden. Outside of the facility, it will build a 12 acres (4.9 ha) public park and beach. The projected admission price for indoor activities is about $40 per person for full-day admittance.

A third company proposed to build a zip-line and adventure park but pulled out of the project. The company and the government could not come to terms on the lease.

Private sector investments are expected to be about $500 million. Public sector investment was not disclosed. A review process for environmental, heritage, and public consultation will likely extend into 2023. Construction is scheduled to begin in 2024, with a 2030 completion.

In February 2022, Toronto city council voted to adopt a process to create an approvals process for the Province's plan for the redevelopment of Ontario Place. This process generally follows the city's traditional development approvals process, notwithstanding Ontario Place is predominately constructed on Provincially-owned land. Based on this timeline, a rezoning application is expected in late 2022 and a site plan approval process began in 2023.

The Cinesphere was closed for renovations. In September 2022, the ministry reported: "Repair work on the Cinesphere, pods, and bridges is proceeding on schedule this fall. Site servicing, including sewage, water, electrical, and gas, is expected to begin in the spring of 2023."

Therme Canada's local partners are the Toronto International Film Festival (TIFF), Mississaugas of the Credit First Nation, and Black North Initiative. TIFF later 'paused' their relationship with Therme ahead of their 2023 festival. Other partners include AECON Group Inc., Diamond Schmitt, and Studio TLA. Strategy Corp is serving Therme Canada with strategy and communications. Swim Drink Fish Canada was a partner, but exited the partnership in the belief that the government's portion of the plan is "simply too opaque and controversial for us to support".

Therme's plans have received strong public backlash, with the group Ontario Place for All leading the campaign against the development. Plans to develop the public space and existing beach by a for-profit private developer became a prominent 2023 election issue in Toronto. The mayoral campaign saw mayor Olivia Chow come out in opposition to the project. Later in 2023, she dropped her opposition to the project when the City and Government of Ontario reached an agreement for the transfer of the two Toronto freeways (Don Valley and Gardiner) to the province, saving the city an estimated $1.2 billion. The community group has continued its opposition, attempting to stop or slow down the project in the courts.

On February 26, 2026, the government unveiled the final design for the new and larger 400,000 sq. ft. facility, which includes doubling the size of the iconic dome-shaped IMAX venue Cinesphere. Construction of the $1B (CAD) facility is expected to begin in Spring 2026 with a completion date in 2029.

In December 2024, the Auditor General of Ontario's annual report included analysis of the redevelopment of Ontario Place and described the selection process as "not fair, transparent or accountable." It found that the Ford government had frequently broken its own selection rules even though those rules were less stringent than normal provincial procurement standards since it allowed the government to select bids that failed to meet the specified criteria. The AG's report further criticized the process for lacking transparency around assessment criteria, which discouraged participant investment in the process while officials from the premier's office, ministerial offices, and Infrastructure Ontario communicated with and advised on favoured bidders. The report also found that the public cost had gone up by $1.8 billion since the start of the process in 2019 to $2.2 billion.

==== Ontario Science Centre ====
On April 18, 2023, Ford announced the provincial government's plan to relocate the Ontario Science Centre to a new facility on the grounds of Ontario Place on the Toronto waterfront. This announcement was met with widespread public backlash due to concerns about potential downsizing and exhibit losses. Both the Architectural Conservancy of Ontario and the Toronto Society of Architects condemned the relocation plans, while the grassroots group Save Ontario's Science Centre organized rallies and campaigns to reverse the government's decision. Toronto City Council also sought to keep the Science Centre at its original location.

In December 2023, the Auditor General of Ontario concluded that the government's decision "was not fully informed and based on preliminary and incomplete costing information, and had proceeded without full consultation from key stakeholders or a clear plan for the existing site".

On June 21, 2024, the Ministry of Infrastructure announced the immediate and permanent closure of the Don Mills location, citing an engineering report revealing water damage affecting 2–6% of the building's roofs. The report estimated that repairs would cost at least $22 million and take two years to complete. Safety concerns about the roof material in question, reinforced autoclaved aerated concrete (RAAC), had caused the temporary or permanent closure of hundreds of buildings in the United Kingdom in 2023. While roughly 400 public buildings in Ontario contain RAAC, the Science Centre is currently the only one in the province closed due to these concerns.

The Ford government expedited its plan to relocate the Science Centre to the waterfront, targeting a 2028 opening, with a temporary location slated for January 2026. This drew further criticism, including from Moriyama Teshima Architects, the firm founded by the Science Centre's original architect.

The architects offered to do pro bono design consulting services for the Government of Ontario to support immediate repairs to the roof, and called for other organizations to join the effort to facilitate repairs. Private donors, including Geoffrey Hinton, offered up to $1 million to fund repairs for the existing facility, but the province did not respond to these offers.

By October 31, 2024, most of the exhibits had been moved to storage facilities in northern Toronto and Guelph, while the animals and plants had been transferred to the Toronto Zoo and The Village at Black Creek. Temporary pop-up exhibits have since opened at Sherway Gardens and Toronto's Harbourfront Centre.

In December 2024, the Auditor General of Ontario questioned the financial prudence of the relocation. Contrary to the Ford government's business plan analysis, which projected $257 million in savings over 50 years, the AG found that relocation costs have already exceeded the anticipated savings, reaching approximately $400 million.

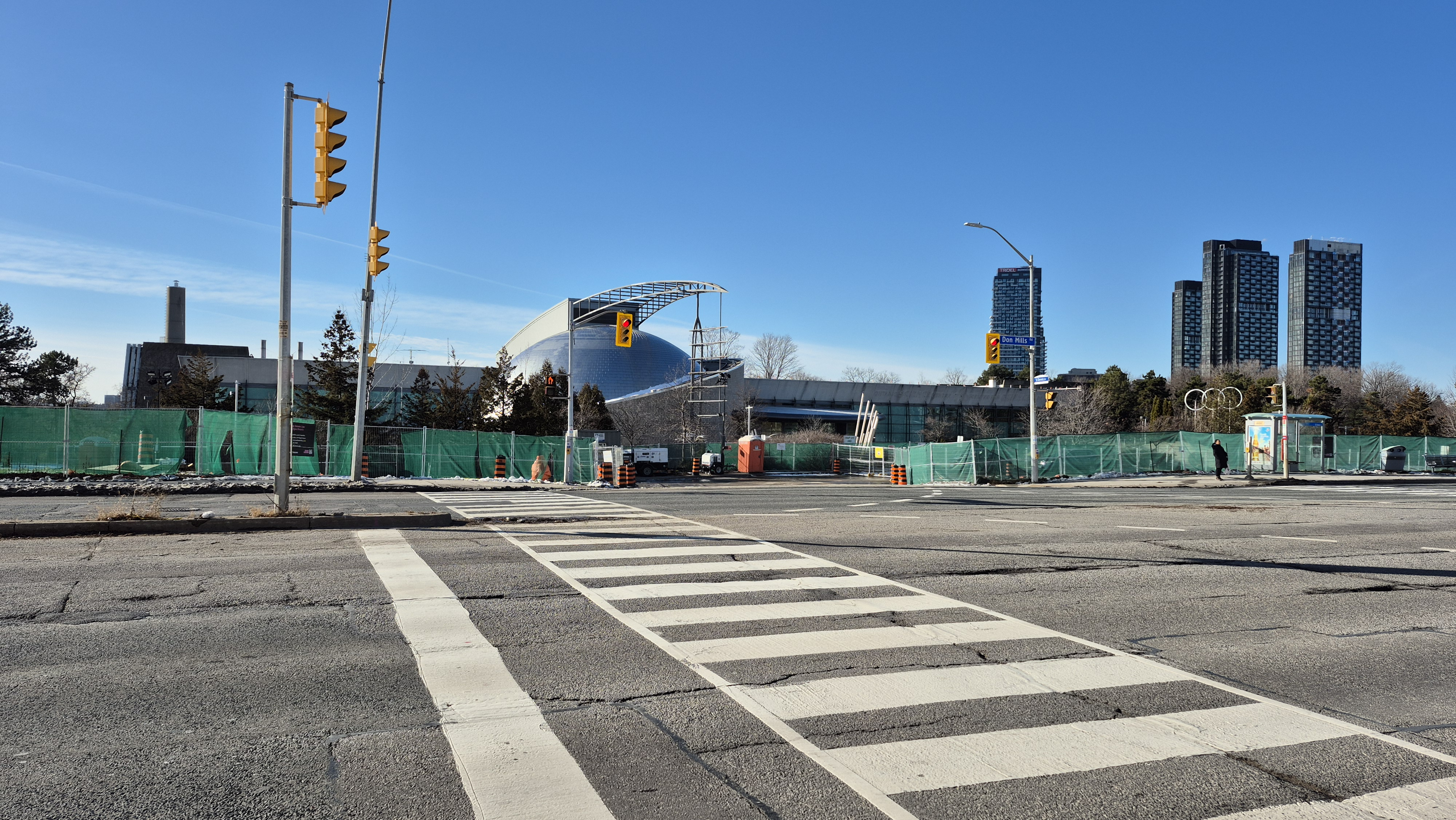
Ontario Science Centre as of December 24, 2025, with signage and removed from the building and the digital sign and flagpoles taken down. The area around it has been undergoing heavy development for the Ontario Line.

In May 2025, the Canadian Architect magazine reported that draft versions of the structural engineering report by Rimkus Consulting that the Ontario government had relied on in deciding to close the centre, had originally recommended routine repairs and not closure, up until May 2024. This revelation was added to earlier reporting from Global News that Infrastructure Ontario had been in frequent communication with Rimkus in the leadup to the public release of the report in June 2024, and led the magazine to conclude that the language describing the consequences of not doing the routine repair that was later used to justify the closure had been inserted after political pressure.

In February 2026, Ford unveiled the designs of the new building and announced that a contract had been awarded for its construction. It will cost an estimated $1 billion and will be smaller than the original facility, with a footprint of about 400,000 square feet. The Centre would also incorporate the Ontario Place pods as exhibit space and the Cinesphere. The proposed move has been controversial.

=== COVID-19 pandemic ===
==== Initial outbreak ====
In December 2019, an outbreak of coronavirus disease 2019 (COVID-19) was first identified in Wuhan, Hubei, China; it spread worldwide and was recognized as a pandemic by the World Health Organization (WHO) on March 11, 2020. The first confirmed case in Canada was in Ontario—reported on January 27, 2020.

On March 17, Ford declared a state of emergency in Ontario, closing bars and restaurants (with the exception of take-out and delivery services), as well as libraries, theatres, cinemas, schools and daycares and all public gatherings of more than 50 people (later reduced to 5 people on March 28). Furthermore, the government announced on March 17 that Ontario had "some evidence of community transmission" of COVID-19.

On March 23, Ford announced that all "non-essential" businesses would be ordered closed starting 11:59 p.m. On March 24. Ford also stated that schools would remain closed past the original April 6 opening date (on May 19 it was announced that schools would remain closed until the following school year in September). A list of 74 "essential" businesses was published later in the day on March 23.

On March 25, Ford and Finance Minister Rod Phillips introduced a $17-billion response package that includes an influx of cash for the health sector, direct payments to parents and tax breaks for businesses.

==== Third wave ====
On April 9, 2021, Ford received his first dose of the AstraZeneca COVID-19 vaccine at a local pharmacy in Toronto, and encouraged eligible Ontarians to get vaccinated.

Amid growing case numbers in mid-2021, the government moved to introduce a third province-wide stay-at-home order. As part of the response, Ford announced on April 16, 2021, that outdoor amenities including playgrounds would be closed, and that he would be authorizing police to require pedestrians and drivers to explain why they are not at home and provide their home address and other relevant details. The regulations raised concerns about a re-legalization of carding. The government experienced significant backlash with the new enforcement measures, with some commentators – such as the National Post's Randall Denley, a former PC politician – equating the province to a "police state" Members of the Ontario COVID-19 Science Table described the new restrictions as "absolute madness", and not based on science questioning the need to restrict "safe options from people as you do nothing to impact the places where the disease is spreading". After dozens of police services across the province announced that they would refuse to enforce the new measures, Ford promptly rolled back the new enforcement provisions the next day and reopened playgrounds, while keeping other outdoor amenities closed.

Over the weekend following the introduction of new orders, calls for Ford's resignation over his handling of the COVID-19 crisis grew, In April 2021, Ford revealed that he had been in isolation following contact with one of his staffers, who had contracted COVID-19. Ford announced on April 30, 2021, that he had asked the federal government to stop international students from coming into the province in an effort to curb the third wave.

==== Omicron variant ====
During the emergence of the Omicron variant of COVID-19 in December 2021 and January 2022, Ford's government announced in December 2021 new restrictions on indoor settings. After growing calls for third or booster doses of COVID-19 vaccines, the government allowed all Ontarians over 18 years of age to receive a third dose on December 20, 2021.

On January 3, 2022, Ford announced that Ontario would be moving into modified Step 2 on January 5, closing indoor dining, gyms, movie theatres and schools.

=== Cannabis ===
Ford supports allowing licensed private retailers to sell cannabis, rather than a government monopoly like the LCBO.

Ford opposed the legalization of recreational cannabis. On January 22, 2019, Huffington Post reported that Ford's youngest daughter Kyla, a bodybuilder and fitness trainer, had posted videos promoting health benefits of CBD oil, a cannabis product which typically does not contain the psychoactive compound present in marijuana. Various publications claimed Kyla's promotion wasn't lawful. Ford's daughter took down the posts, but neither Ford nor his daughter commented on them.

== Controversies ==
=== Private jet controversy ===
In April 2026, Ford's government purchased a $28.9 million Bombardier 650 luxury private jet, intended to be used by the premier for travel. After backlash from the public and opposition parties, the government announced their intention to sell the jet.

=== Bill 66 ===
On December 6, 2018, the Ford government tabled its omnibus bill, Bill 66. The bill allows municipalities to request a provincial government override of any regulations that currently deter businesses from locating in the region. Ford's political opponents and groups that promote environmental protection raised concerns that the "opaque", "vague language" in Bill 66 could mean clean water regulations and other bylaws that protect environmentally sensitive land could be bypassed. According to a December 7 Globe and Mail article, under Bill 66, municipalities would only be required to obtain permission from the minister of municipal affairs, to override sections of the 2006 Clean Water Act, the 2015 Great Lakes Protection Act, the 2006 Lake Simcoe Protection Act, and the 2005 Greenbelt Act.

=== Disputes with other politicians ===
In October 2023, Ford publicly stated that MPP Sarah Jama had a "long and well-documented history of antisemitism" and "hateful views", and that she "publicly support[ed] the rape and murder of innocent Jewish people," and called for her to resign. In response, Jama served Ford's office a cease and desist letter and threatened to sue him for libel. In April 2024, Doug Ford called for the reversal of the Speaker's ban on wearing keffiyeh in the legislature, which was imposed after an unidentified MPP complained about Sarah Jama donning a Palestinian keffiyeh at the start of the Gaza war. The motion to overrule the ban did not receive unanimous consent and remained in effect. In August 2026, it was reported that Ford's Progressive Conservative Party had sent a party official to follow Ontario Liberal Party leader Bonnie Crombie while she vacationed in Jamaica shortly after her election in 2023.

=== Toronto-area hotel expenses scandal ===
Between 2023 and 2026, Toronto MPP Stan Cho expensed $16,203 to the Ontario Legislature for hotel stays in Toronto, despite his residence being 5.9 kilometres from the Legislative Assembly. Through his office, Cho issued a comment, stating that "[w]hile these expenses meet the criteria for special circumstances as set out by the Legislative Guide for Member’s expenses, I will be personally reimbursing the legislature for any expense that does not meet the spirit of the policy," before later commenting that "I will be personally reimbursing the legislature for the entire amount of the expenses incurred". Cho faced criticism from the opposition, with New Democratic leader Marit Stiles noting that "[you] can get from Willowdale to Queen’s Park without even changing the subway train". Cho was also directed to repay the expenses by Premier Doug Ford, who told him "[you're] paying back every single penny — that’s not the way we operate, simple as that". He delivered his letter of resignation, effective immediately, to Premier Ford during the morning of July 17, 2026. Cho stated he will continue to serve as a Member of Provincial Parliament (MPP) for Willowdale. Other PC MPPs also expensed Toronto hotel stays using the policy, which Ford announced plans to reform.

=== Ontario News Now ===
Shortly after taking office in 2018, the Ford government announced Ontario News Now, a partisan social media news channel that would highlight the government's actions and policies. ONN was paid for by PC caucus services, which receives taxpayer funding from the legislature. The channel was shut down in 2019.

Ontarian premierships
Preceded by Kathleen Wynne	Doug Ford; 2018–present	Incumbent
