= Doug Ford =

Premier of Ontario since 2018

The Honourable Doug Ford ECO MPP
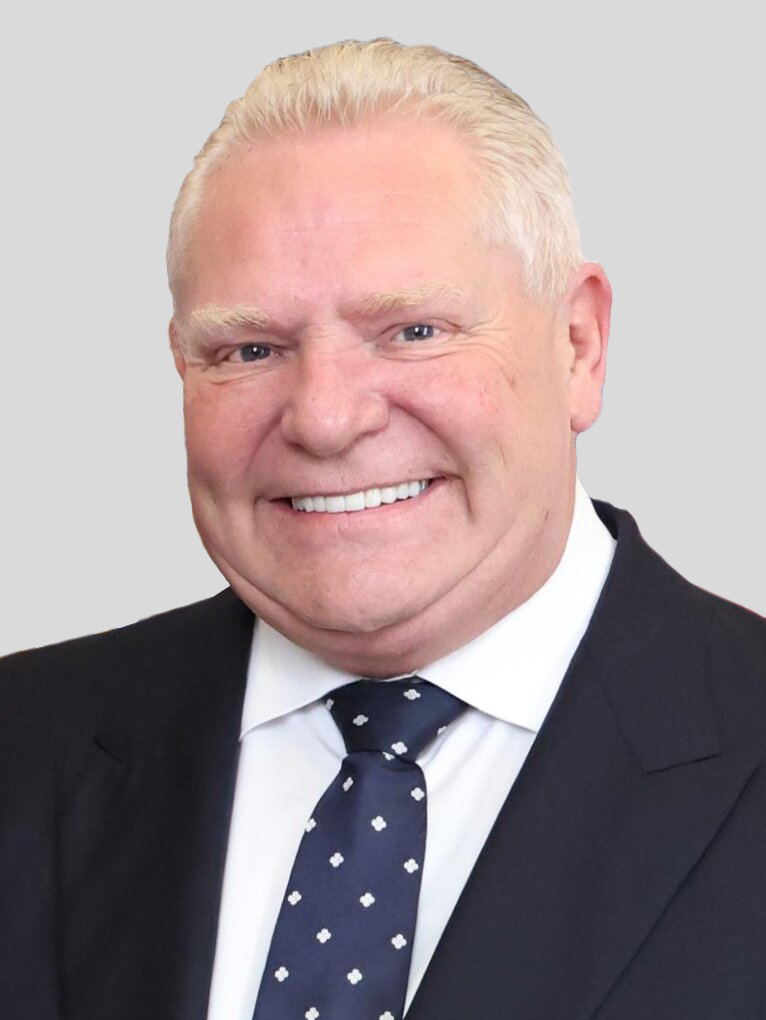
- Ford in 2025

26th Premier of Ontario
- Incumbent
- Assumed office June 29, 2018
- Monarchs: Elizabeth II; Charles III
- Lieutenant Governor: Elizabeth Dowdeswell; Edith Dumont
- Deputy: Christine Elliott; Sylvia Jones
- Preceded by: Kathleen Wynne

Minister of Intergovernmental Affairs
- Incumbent
- Assumed office June 29, 2018
- Premier: Himself
- Preceded by: Kathleen Wynne

Leader of the Progressive Conservative Party of Ontario
- Incumbent
- Assumed office March 10, 2018
- Preceded by: Vic Fedeli (interim)

Chair of the Council of the Federation
- In office August 1, 2024 – August 1, 2025
- Preceded by: Tim Houston
- Succeeded by: Rob Lantz

Member of Provincial Parliament for Etobicoke North
- Incumbent
- Assumed office June 7, 2018
- Preceded by: Shafiq Qaadri

Toronto City Councillor for Ward 2 Etobicoke North
- In office December 1, 2010 – December 1, 2014
- Preceded by: Rob Ford
- Succeeded by: Rob Ford

Personal details
- Born: Douglas Robert Ford Jr. November 20, 1964 (age 62) Etobicoke, Ontario, Canada
- Party: Progressive Conservative
- Spouse: Karla Middlebrook Ford
- Children: 4, including Krista
- Parents: Doug Ford Sr. (father); Ruth Diane Campbell (mother)
- Relatives: Rob Ford (brother); Michael Ford (nephew)
- Education: Humber College (no degree)
- Occupation: Businessman; politician
- Website: fordmpp.ca

Douglas Robert Ford Jr. (born November 20, 1964) is a Canadian politician and businessman who has served as the 26th premier of Ontario and as leader of the Progressive Conservative (PC) Party of Ontario since 2018. He represents the Toronto riding of Etobicoke North in the Legislative Assembly of Ontario.

Alongside his brother Randy, Ford co-owns Deco Labels and Tags, a printing business operating in Canada and the United States founded by their father, Doug Ford Sr., who served as a Member of Provincial Parliament (MPP) from 1995 to 1999. Ford was a Toronto city councillor for Ward 2 Etobicoke North from 2010 to 2014 at the same time that his brother, Rob Ford, was mayor of Toronto. Ford ran in the 2014 Toronto mayoral election, placing second to John Tory.

In 2018, Ford entered provincial politics and won the Progressive Conservative Party leadership election held that year. He has led the party to three consecutive majority governments during his tenure as party leader in the 2018, 2022, and 2025 general elections. As premier, Ford decreased the size of the Toronto City Council, responded to the COVID-19 pandemic, granted extra powers to designated Ontario mayors through the Strong Mayors, Building Homes Act, enacted the Your Health Act (Bill 60) to expand the use of private healthcare services, responded to the imposition of U.S. tariffs on Canadian goods, and became embroiled in controversy over the Greenbelt scandal.

Ford's rhetoric and policies were characterized as conservative and right-wing populist during his years in Toronto municipal politics and his early years as premier, but since 2020 and with the need to work with the federal Liberal government during the pandemic, the Freedom Convoy protests, and U.S. president Donald Trump's tariffs against Canada, political commentators have noted his gradual shift to the political centre with a more co-operative attitude toward the federal government, while seemingly exhibiting less public support for the federal Conservative Party.

== Early life, family, and education ==
Born in Etobicoke, Ontario, Douglas Robert Ford Jr. was the second of four children of Doug Bruce Ford Sr. and Ruth Diane Ford (née Campbell). His paternal grandparents were English immigrants. He graduated grade twelve from Scarlett Heights Collegiate Institute. He then attended Humber College for two months before dropping out with no diploma. He received an Honorary Doctorate in Humane Letters from Saginaw Valley State University.

== Business career and early political involvement ==
In the 1990s, Ford became involved in the running of Deco Labels and Tags, a business co-founded by his father in 1962. The company makes pressure-sensitive labels for plastic-wrapped grocery products. Doug Jr. became president of the company in 2002 and was responsible for the company's expansion into Chicago. Nearing his death, his father divided up the company, leaving 40 percent to Doug Jr., 40 percent to Randy and 20 percent to Rob. In 2008, Doug Jr. launched the purchase of Wise Tag and Label in New Jersey and fired Wise Tag's manager. Former Deco employees suggest that the Chicago branch was well-managed under Doug Jr., and that he was well-liked but that the company declined under Randy's leadership after Doug Jr. entered politics in 2010. As of 2011, Ford and his mother were directors of the company, managed by his brother Randy.

Ford's first involvement in politics came when Doug Holyday approached Deco to print stickers for signs for his 1994 mayoral campaign in Etobicoke. Ford took it upon himself to canvass for Holyday. He then assisted in his father's campaigns as a PC MPP candidate in 1995 and 1999. He also ran his brother Rob's council campaigns in 2000, 2003, and 2006, and Rob's winning mayoral campaign in 2010.

== Municipal politics (2010–2018) ==
=== Toronto City Councillor ===
On October 25, 2010, Ford was elected as councillor to Toronto City Council in Ward 2. He succeeded his brother, Rob, who ran successfully for mayor of Toronto. Upon election, Doug Ford announced that he would donate his $100,000 annual salary to community organizations.

As a city councillor, Ford voted to privatise garbage pickup west of Yonge Street, declare the Toronto Transit Commission an essential service, reduce the office budget of city councillors and eliminate the vehicle registration tax.

==== Boards and agencies ====
While on city council, Ford served on the board of Build Toronto, an arm's-length city body responsible for developing and selling city land. He was also a director of the Canadian National Exhibition, and served on the Budget Committee, the Civic Appointments Committee and the Government Management Committee at Council.

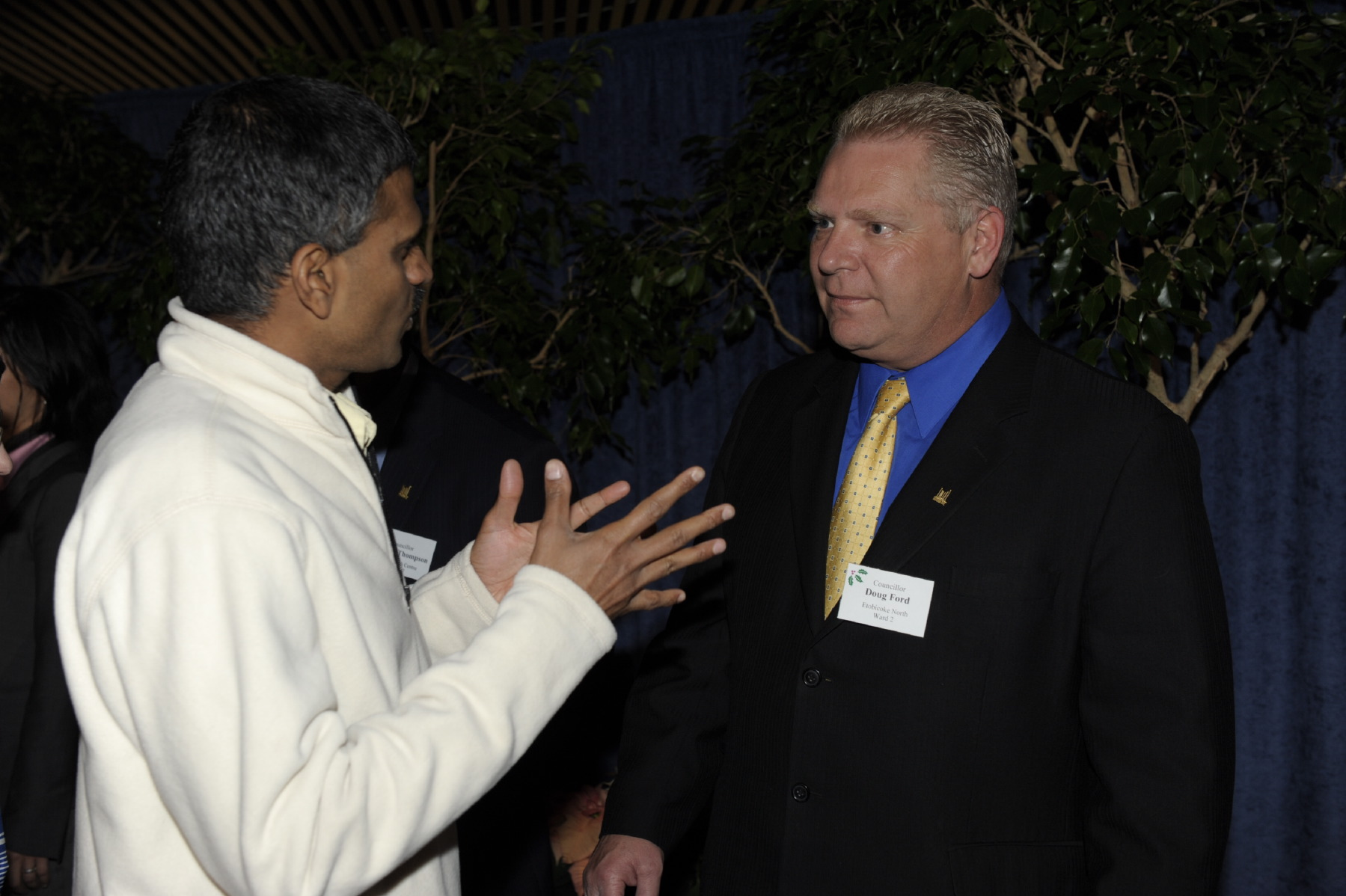
Ford attending the City of Toronto's 2011 New Year's levee

Ford was a member of the board of Toronto Transit Infrastructure Limited, a corporation set up to finance a Sheppard Avenue subway extension, which Council later cancelled. In 2011, Ford promoted an alternative plan for the Port Lands district of Toronto, including a monorail, a boat-in hotel, the world's largest Ferris wheel and a mega-mall. The plan was ridiculed in the media and council voted it down—including by members of the mayoral executive committee.

==== Other events while councillor ====
Ford caused controversy after revealing that his brother Rob would be served a subpoena if Rob's friend and driver Alexander Lisi went to court over charges of extortion. Ford commented that the subpoena was in "payback" for Toronto Police Chief Bill Blair's not getting a contract renewal with the Toronto Police Service, saying "This is why we need a change at the top", in regards to Blair's contract. Blair filed a defamation lawsuit, demanding a written apology in exchange for dropping the suit. Ford apologized and retracted the comments.

An investigative report by The Globe and Mail published in May 2013 alleged that Ford had sold hashish at James Gardens for several years in the 1980s, based on interviews with anonymous sources. Ford, who had never been charged with drug possession or trafficking, denied the allegations and accused the newspaper of unfairly targeting his brother, then-mayor Rob Ford. The newspaper defended its report and its use of anonymous sources at an Ontario Press Council hearing, which dismissed complaints against the newspaper and found that its coverage was "fair and ethical". Ford said at the time that he planned to sue the newspaper for libel. When asked in a 2018 interview why he had not sued, he replied that he had decided a lawsuit would be a "waste of time".

Ford opposed a house for developmentally disabled youth in his ward, saying the home had "ruined the community".

=== 2014 mayoral election ===
In June 2013, Ford announced that he would not run for re-election as councillor in the next Toronto election, scheduled for 2014: "I won't be running next time, at least down here I won't be running, I'll be running away from this place in 16 months", expressing his frustration with municipal politics. It was speculated at the time that Ford may be a Progressive Conservative candidate for a future Ontario election, or interested in the leadership of the PCs. On February 20, 2014, after meeting with PC leader Tim Hudak, Ford announced that he would not be a candidate in the next provincial election, which was called for June 12, 2014, so that he could focus on his brother's re-election campaign. Ford explained, "The timing right now just doesn't work."

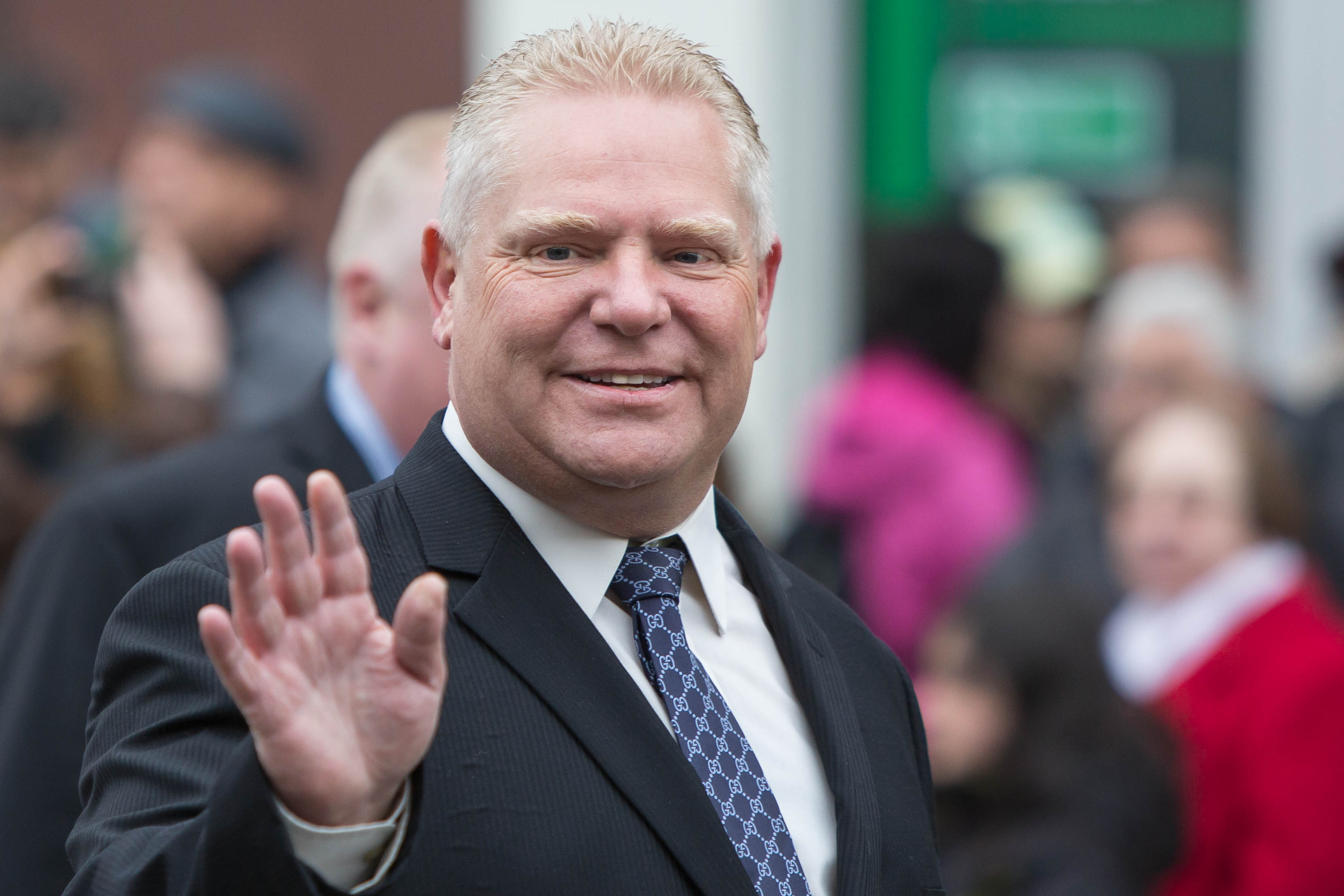
Ford attending a Good Friday procession in East York, April 2014

After his brother Rob entered drug rehab in May 2014, Ford commented that he would not rule out running for mayor. Rob returned from rehab and continued his campaign for mayor, but withdrew after he was diagnosed with an abdominal tumour and hospitalized. Doug Ford then entered the mayoral campaign in the last hour before the nomination deadline on September 12, 2014. Comments Ford made during the campaign received criticism for alleged bigotry, such as misogyny and antisemitism, and critics accused him of conflict of interest and of drug dealing in the past. Though voters viewed the brothers as having the same ideological stance and gave them similar levels of support, Rob's drug scandal received little attention with regard to Doug's campaign.

Ford's campaign got the attention of Last Week Tonight's John Oliver, who closed an episode begging Torontonians to vote for Doug Ford for the world's amusement. Doug Ford maintained the support that Rob had in the polls and made no significant ground against frontrunner John Tory, but maintained his lead over Olivia Chow. Ford lost the election to Tory, having 34 percent of the support compared to Tory's 40 percent. Ford's campaign was fined $11,950 for placing 478 illegal lawn signs during the campaign, including placing signs on the Don Valley Parkway, the Gardiner Expressway, and on civic buildings and parks.

Following his unsuccessful mayoral candidacy, there was speculation that Ford would become a candidate for the leadership of the Progressive Conservative Party of Ontario. Ford told reporters: "It's on the table, I would really consider it", and added: "Our campaign is ready to go. Our people are itching to get involved. We are miles ahead of the other candidates." On November 27, 2014, Ford announced that he would not be a candidate for the position and endorsed the candidacy of family friend Christine Elliott.

=== Integrity commissioner ruling controversy ===
In December 2016, the City of Toronto's integrity commissioner concluded that Ford broke the city's code of conduct when he was a councillor finding that Ford improperly used his influence in municipal matters pertaining to two companies that were clients of his family's company. Integrity Commissioner Valerie Jepson ruled that: "Councillor Ford took no steps to establish clear lines of separation between his responsibilities as a member of Council and his duties as a principal of Deco."

Since Ford was no longer a councillor by the time the ruling was issued, the commissioner did not recommend any sanctions for Ford.

=== 2018 mayoral election ===
On September 9, 2017, Ford announced at his family's annual barbecue that he would run for mayor of Toronto in the 2018 election, saying "this one's for you, Robbie", referring to his younger brother Rob who had died the previous year. Ford said that his opponent, John Tory, was "all talk and broken promises". On February 1, 2018, Ford announced that he no longer planned to run for mayor that year because he intended to focus entirely on his campaign for Ontario PC leader.

== Provincial politics ==
=== 2018 Progressive Conservative leadership campaign ===
Top map: Results of the first round by plurality of points. Bottom map: Results of the 3rd (final) round by plurality of points

Following the sudden resignation of Patrick Brown on January 25, 2018, the Progressive Conservative Party of Ontario announced a new leader would need to be chosen before the 2018 Ontario general election in June. Ford was the first candidate to announce, on January 29, that he would seek the leadership of the party. On January 31, 2018, Ford announced he would seek the PC nomination in Etobicoke North and run for the seat in the 2018 election. He was one of the four official candidates running for the PC leadership along with Christine Elliott, Caroline Mulroney, and Tanya Granic Allen.

Ford promised to represent the interests of Northern Ontario in Queen's Park. He called his opponents "insiders" and "political elites", who did not represent the interests of the residents of Northern Ontario like he could. Ford pledged several northern-focused policy initiatives including moving forward with resource development in the Northern Ontario Ring of Fire and reinstating the Ontario Northland Railway's Northlander train service.

Ford called the Ontario health care system "broken" while relating the hospital experience of his brother Rob. He explained that Rob fell while being guided to a chair, and as the hospital was understaffed, Doug had to rush down eleven floors to find security guards to help. He stated that the province should support transportation to allow Northern Ontarians to travel quickly and easily to the south to receive medical care and should increase provincial support for Ontario's small and medium-sized hospitals.

Polling results ahead of the leadership ballot were mixed. A February Ipsos/Global News poll found that Ford had the most support of all the PC leadership candidates in Toronto and would beat the Liberals in the city by nine points, but a Mainstreet poll showed him doing only marginally better than the other PC candidates except Patrick Brown, and a Forum Research poll suggested he would have less support than the other candidates.

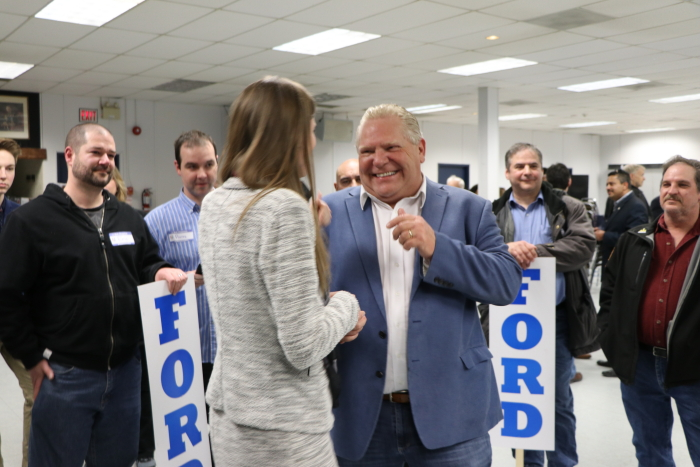
Ford at the Canadian Corps Association in Oshawa, March 2018

On March 10, Ford won the PC leadership on the third ballot. The results were too close to call and there was a dispute over whether some votes were allocated to the correct electoral districts, so the announcement was not made at the originally scheduled convention. A news conference was held later that night after a recount was completed. Elliott conceded the next day and endorsed Ford as leader.

On March 27, 2018, Ford was named the party's candidate in Etobicoke North.

=== 2018 general election ===
In March 2018, the Liberals tabled a pre-election budget in the provincial legislature which promised billions of dollars in new spending for free childcare and expanded coverage for dental care but replaced the government's previous balanced budget with a $6.7 billion deficit projected to last until 2024–2025. Ford called the budget a "spending spree". He said he would condense the Conservative platform adopted under former leader Patrick Brown, reducing "about ten percent of [it]", into a five-point plan focusing on health, education, creating jobs, getting rid of the province's cap and trade program for carbon emissions, and reducing electricity rates.

Ford was critical of the sex education components of the Ontario health curriculum which was updated in 2015, and stated that he believed it needed to be reviewed. He suggested that minors should be required to consult their parents before obtaining an abortion, and indicated he would allow the introduction of a private member's bill requiring parental consent. In terms of economic policy, Ford said he would revive manufacturing in Ontario by easing regulations, cutting taxes, and ensuring competitive electricity rates. Ford criticized the Liberal government for not proceeding quickly enough to develop the Northern Ontario Ring of Fire, saying that he would get on a bulldozer himself if necessary.

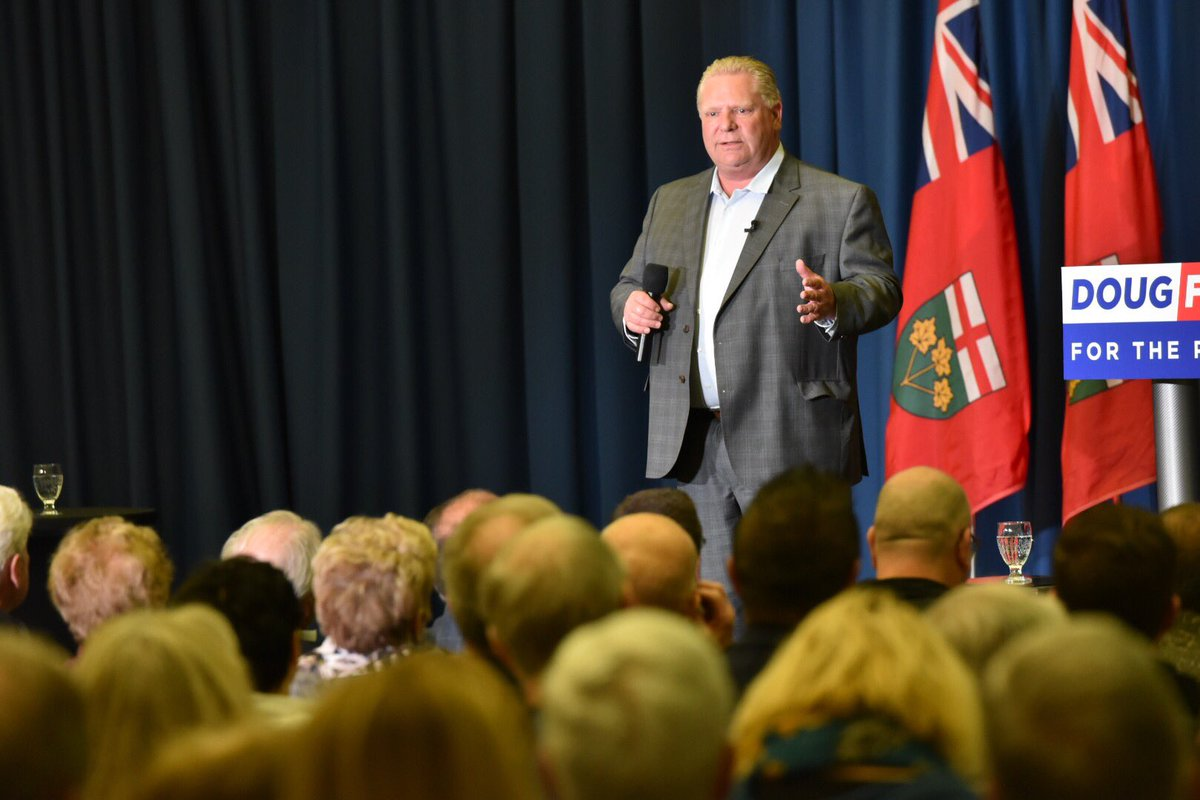
Ford speaks to a crowd in Sudbury, May 2018

Ford announced at an April 3 rally in Hamilton, Ontario, that if elected his government would allow Hamilton City Council to reallocate the $1.3 billion allocated for the city's proposed rapid transit system to roads or other infrastructure. Hamilton mayor Fred Eisenberger responded saying that city council had already decided the issue and that cancelling the LRT would mean $100 million would "be thrown away".

Ford and the PC Party received the endorsement of former Toronto mayor Mel Lastman and former Mississauga mayor Hazel McCallion. In the media, Ford was compared to U.S. President Donald Trump. The Guardian described Ford as a "businessman turned anti-establishment politician", a "son of a wealthy entrepreneur" who "rails against elites" and "often shuns expertise", while noting a sharp difference with Trump by pointing out that during his 2014 Toronto mayoral campaign "Ford drummed up strong support among some of the city's most diverse neighbourhoods, suggesting his populist touch resonates with immigrants and racialized minorities who have traditionally self-identified as disenfranchised". Ford rejected the comparisons while praising some of Trump's policies. Late in the campaign, the race became a battle between the PCs and the Ontario NDP.

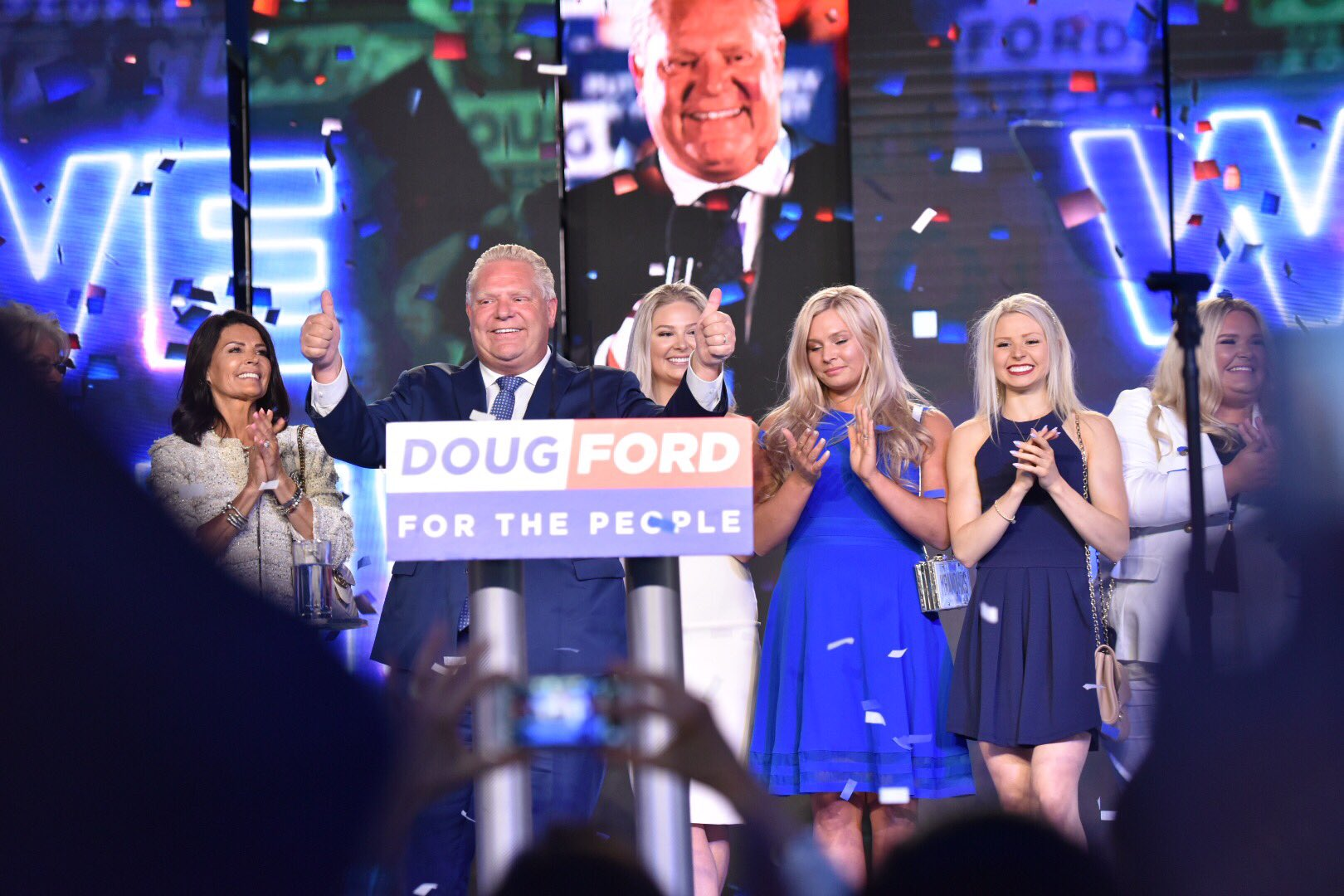
Ford celebrating his party's electoral victory in the Ontario general election, June 2018

Ford led the PC Party to a majority government in the general election held on June 7, 2018, taking 76 of 124 seats in the Legislative Assembly of Ontario, including his own riding of Etobicoke North. Ford had been PC leader for less than 100 days when his party won the election.

== Premier of Ontario (2018–present) ==
Ford was sworn in as premier on June 29, 2018, incorporating a ceremony outdoors on the lawn of Queen's Park. Ford is the first newly elected MPP to take office as premier since Mitch Hepburn did so in 1934.

=== Provincial finances ===
On November 15, 2018, Finance Minister Vic Fedeli tabled the 2018 Ontario Economic Outlook which included a tax cut representing as much as $850 a year for individuals and $1,700 for couples. LIFT would mean that a single person working full-time in a minimum wage job would pay no provincial personal income tax. Minimum wage workers would still pay federal income tax, which represents 75 percent of the tax rate. LIFT is a variation on Ford's promise to cut taxes on those making less than $30,000 a year. The amount of the tax credit applies only to minimum wage earners with full-time jobs. An individual who works part-time at $20 an hour, but only earns $20,000 a year, would not be eligible. Economist Sheila Block said that a $15 minimum wage would represent about $1,100 more a year for low income earners than Ford's tax credit. In September 2018, Ford's government froze the minimum wage at $14 per hour and cancelled a planned increase.

While Ford promised a balanced budget in 2018, the Ontario debt has increased by $86 billion since he took office, as of December 2024. This is an increase much greater than his predecessor's, whose budget Ford criticized. At the same time, Ontario's high income taxes have been called 'uncompetitive' by critics, with some also highlighting unnecessary spending by the government.

==== Liquor ====
Ford attempted to reform alcohol sales through the liberalization of liquor. Ford campaigned on "buck-a-beer" and reduced the minimum price of beer from $1.25 to $1. The program saw low adoption by breweries and resellers. As a result of lowering the price floor, a regulation that capped annual increases in pricing that was tied to the Consumer Price Index (CPI) was also eliminated and is projected to result in increased prices overall. Ford negotiated an agreement with The Beer Store that accelerated the date on which convenience stores could sell liquor, at an estimated cost of $612 million.

==== Cap and trade ====
On June 15, 2018, then premier-designate, Ford announced in a statement that one of the first actions of his newly formed cabinet would be to eliminate the province's cap and trade program under the 2016 Climate Change Mitigation and Low-Carbon Economy Act, a polluter pay bill that "generated funds for climate change mitigation and adaptation," put in place by the Liberal government. As premier, through the Cap and Trade Cancellation Act, 2018 which was tabled on July 25, 2018, Ford repealed cap and trade as part of his promise to lower gasoline prices by 10 cents per litre. A court later ruled that as Ontario's Environmental Bill of Rights required the government hold public consultations before removing the program, the government's unilateral decision broke the law. As federal law requires provinces to have in place their own pollution pricing system, as a result of Ontario withdrawing from the Western Climate Initiative, a carbon tax was automatically imposed on the province.

==== Carbon tax ====
Ford had warned that the imposition of the federal carbon tax would result in an increase in the price of gas in Ontario. According to fuel price analyst Patrick DeHaan, the average retail price of gas increased from 114.3 cents per litre before the carbon tax to "117.9 cents on April 1, the first day of the new tax" and 125.3 cents per litre in mid-July. There has been a 9.2 per cent drop in gasoline prices across Canada over the last year, according to the July 17, 2019 Statistics Canada report which resulted in inflation falling nationally in June 2019 to 2.0 per cent. DeHaan said that in July 2018 the average price of gas in Ontario had been 130.1 cents per litre. He added that the retail price of gas reflects the drop in the price of oil from US$72 per barrel to US$60 a barrel in 2019 and is not related to the carbon tax. As a result, rebates for electric vehicles funded through the program were cancelled, and a program known as the Green Ontario Fund, which was financed by the proceeds of cap-and-trade auctions and aimed to help homeowners reduce their carbon footprint and reduce hydro bills, was eliminated.

In July, Canadian Prime Minister Justin Trudeau said that provinces that do not adopt a carbon pricing mechanism by September 1, 2018, would be subject to a federal carbon tax of $20/tonne starting in January 2019. Ontario's "fiscal watchdog" and other analysts said that the province will have to refund an estimated $3 billion in carbon credits over four years purchased under the cap and trade program. By mid-November 2018, The Globe and Mail reported that the Ontario government had "lost $2.7-billion in revenue" which included the $1.5-billion loss of revenue from the elimination of the cap-and-trade program.

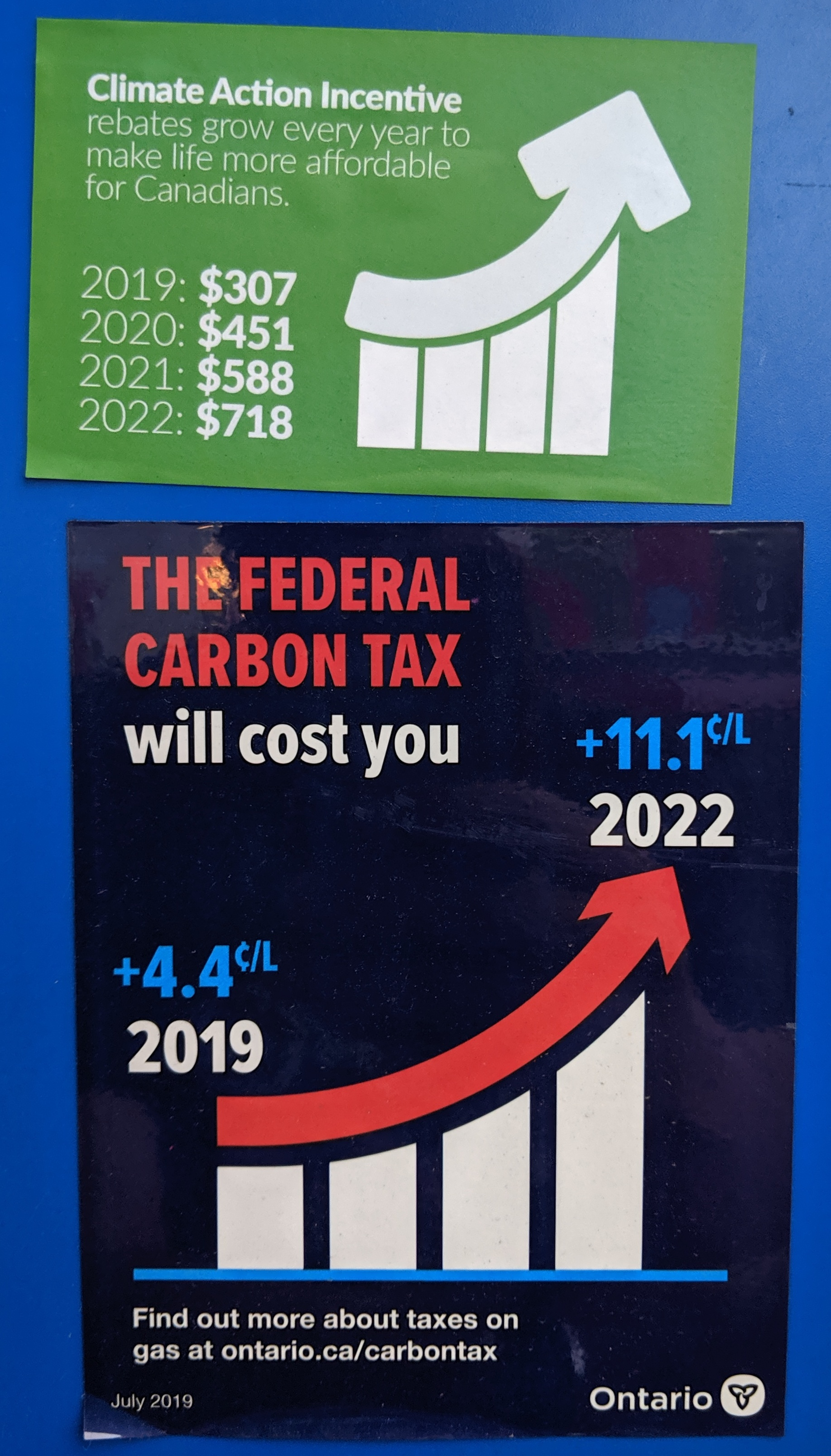
Carbon tax decals on gas pumps in Ontario, mandated by the Ford government during the 2019 federal election

Ford has worked with the premiers of Saskatchewan, Manitoba and New Brunswick to fight the federal government's carbon tax legislation, and has also supported campaigns to repeal the carbon tax led by federal Conservative Party leader Andrew Scheer and Alberta United Conservative Party leader Jason Kenney. Ford believes the federal Greenhouse Gas Pollution Pricing Act, which imposes a carbon tax on provinces that do not have their own pollution pricing regime is unconstitutional. He committed $30 million to challenge the federal legislation, $4 million of which was spent on anti-carbon pricing advertisements including printing anti-carbon pricing stickers and imposing fines for gas station owners failing to display the stickers. The province mandating the display of the stickers was later ruled to be itself unconstitutional, in violation of section 2(b) of the Canadian Charter of Rights and Freedoms, which guarantees business owners' freedom of expression.

On March 25, 2021, the Supreme Court of Canada ruled that the constitution allows for the federal government to introduce pollution pricing on behalf of provinces who do not have their own regime.

=== Healthcare ===
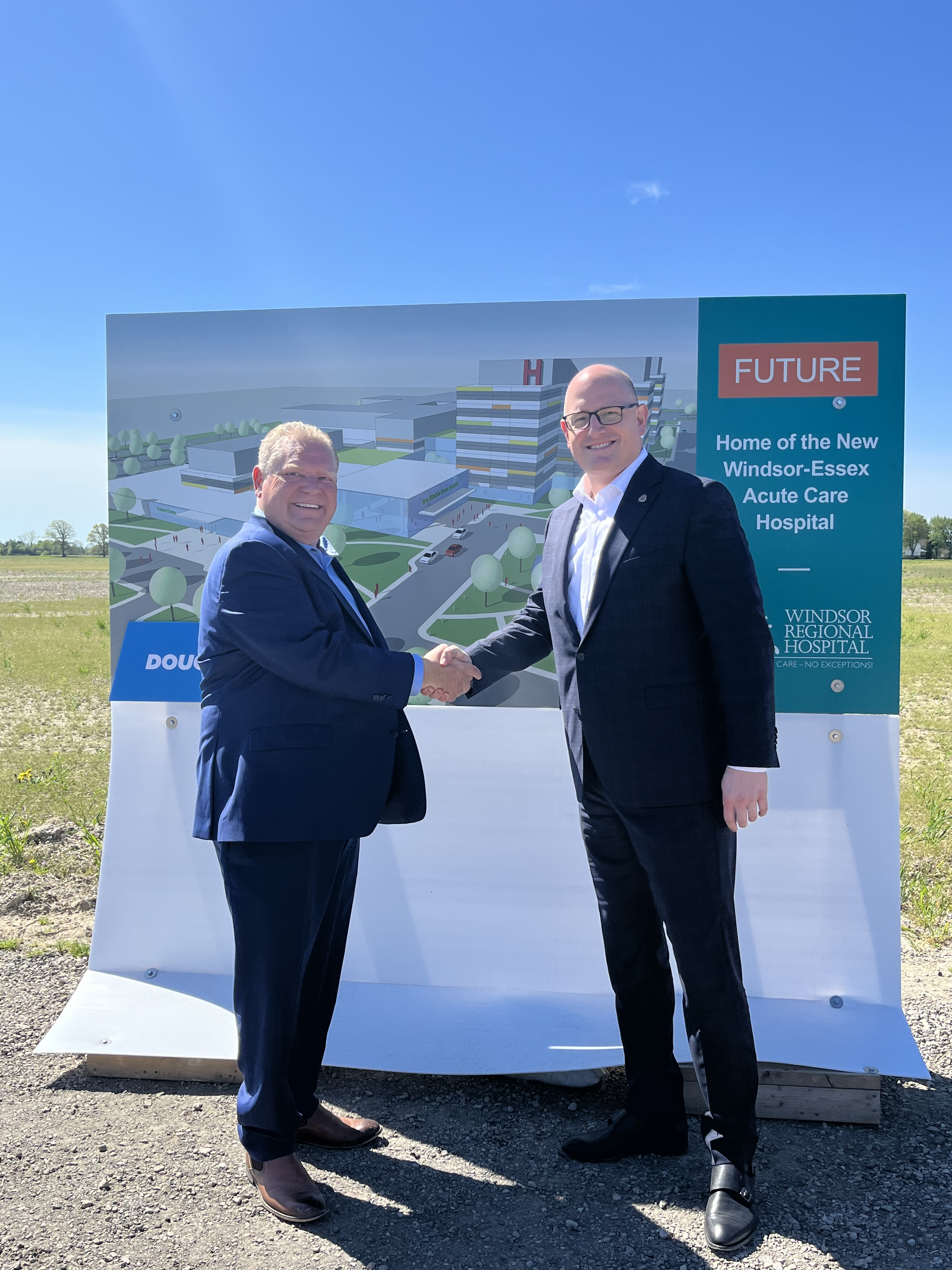
Ford with Windsor mayor Drew Dilkens at the future site of the Windsor-Essex Acute Care Hospital, May 2022

In 2018, Ford expressed support for publicly funded healthcare and a belief that funding should be increased to create 30,000 additional long-term care beds. In 2020, Ford's government spent $3.5 billion less on health care than budgeted.

In 2018, Ford said he believes that the provincial government should fully subsidize dental costs for low-income seniors, something he enacted in 2019 as the Ontario Seniors Dental Care Program. The federal government also later enacted the Canadian Dental Care Plan, which partially subsidized dental care for qualifying individuals with a household income under 90k. Applications were open to seniors, kids and teens, and adults with qualifying disabilities as of December 2024.

In 2023, Ontario saw 1,199 ER closures, mostly impacting rural areas. This problem further increased in 2024, to nearly 15,000 hours of ER or urgent care closures. The main reasons cited were staff shortages, specifically of nurses, which combined accounted for 96% of closures. The Ford government pledged $44 million in July 2023 to combat the closures and $500 million in November 2024 for educating more nurses and specialized training for current ones.

==== Ontario Health ====
The Ford government introduced the Ontario Health agency in 2019, with the goal of centralizing services. The province expects to save $350 million a year by 2021–22.

The introduction of the agency has been criticized however, as a similar approach was introduced in Alberta, which has the highest per capita healthcare spending in the country, with the NDP noting that "In British Columbia and in Alberta, health centralization wasted billions of dollars", and it wasted "time, money and energy on reshaping the health bureaucracy" rather than providing "specific solutions to well-identified problems."

==== Bill 60 ====
Ford has been accused of attempting to privatize healthcare in the province of Ontario. In August 2022, Ford suggested additional private deliveries of healthcare in order to supplement existing public healthcare in response to a hospital staff shortage throughout Ontario.

In May 2023, Ford's government passed Bill 60, also known as the Your Health Act, to allow private clinics to perform more surgeries (including cataract surgeries, minimally invasive gynecological surgeries and eventually knee and hip replacements) and procedures (including MRI and CT scans) covered by the Ontario Health Insurance Plan (OHIP). Health Minister Sylvia Jones argued the legislation was necessary to reduce the province's large surgical backlog (according to the province, more than 200,000 Ontarians have been waiting for surgeries). Ford's government said new clinics must apply for a licence to operate and include thorough staffing plans "to protect the stability of doctors, nurses and other health-care workers at public hospitals" as part of their applications. To ensure that quality and safety standards are met at every clinic, the government declared that it will name "expert organizations" to collaborate with Ontario Health and the Ministry of Health. If necessary, the ministry or the director of this third party may order an examination of a facility.

The Ontario government was also found to be paying for-profit clinics more for publicly funded surgeries than they do for hospitals. Ford and his health minister have said that this is a cost-efficient method of expanding healthcare, but the chief of surgery at an Ontario hospital called the overpayment "egregious".

=== Education ===
Immediately after taking office in 2018, Ford proposed to cut 3,475 Ontario teaching jobs over four years to save $292 million a year, Ford also cancelled the Green Ontario Fund residential rebate program which included a $100 million fund for public school repair, and an initiative to add indigenous peoples content to school curriculum, and eliminated free tuition for low-income students (while reducing tuition fees by 10 per cent),

On July 11, 2018, Ford announced that Ontario's health curriculum including sexual education components, updated by the previous government in 2015, would be reverted to the 1998 curriculum before the next school year. He pledged to create a new sex-education curriculum after consulting with parents and teachers. Ford stated the sex-education curriculum needed to be changed because it was not age-appropriate and not based on enough consultation. However, his 2019 curriculum was largely similar to the 2015 version, save for allowing parents to opt-out.

Ford believes that financial literacy education should be expanded and included in school curricula, and believes Ontario's math curriculum should drop discovery learning and put a greater emphasis on arithmetic and memorization of the multiplication table.

Ford used back-to-work legislation to end the 2018 strike at York University prior to the start of the 2018–2019 school year. The strike had gone on for over four months, making it the longest post-secondary strike in Canadian history. Ford ordered all public universities and colleges in Ontario to develop free-speech policies that meet his government's expectations and stated that universities and colleges that do not comply will face funding reductions.

By June 2019, the Ford government had removed or decreased funding for "school programs like after-school jobs for youth in low-income neighbourhoods", "tutors in classrooms", "daily physical activity for elementary students", "financial assistance for college and university students", "free tuition for low-income students", and "three satellite university campuses". He also "increased class sizes" and "cancelled three summer curriculum-writing sessions—one mandated by the Truth and Reconciliation Commission and two others.

Under Calandra's tenure as education minister, the government has taken over multiple school boards, appointing supervisors instead. The Ford government later announced education reforms, including the reduction of the number of elected trustees, introducing mandatory final exams, and making attendance part of final marks for secondary school students.

In early 2026, the Ford government announced changes to the Ontario Student Assistance Program (OSAP) and billions in new funding for Ontario's financially struggling colleges and universities. The government announced the end of the tuition freeze for public colleges and universities, allowing them to raise fees by up to two percent per year over three years, and announced changes to OSAP funding, with grants reduced to a maximum of 25 percent for grants, and loans increased to a minimum of 75 percent; the changes saw protests from students across the province. This followed changes made to the program by the government in January 2019, which included a 10% tuition fee reduction for all programs in 2019–20, followed by a freeze in 2020–21, and the cutting of the OSAP budget from $2 billion to $1.4 billion.

==== 2022 CUPE strike ====
Ford's government introduced Bill 28, known as the Keeping Students in Class Act, which was passed by the Legislative Assembly of Ontario on November 3, 2022, amid ongoing labour negotiations with the Canadian Union of Public Employees (CUPE). CUPE had given notice of job action October 30 after negotiations broke down with the Ministry of Education, and would have been in a legal strike position on November 4. Bill 28 imposes a contract on CUPE, and makes it illegal to strike, setting fines of $4000 for workers. The bill invokes the notwithstanding clause, shielding it from being struck down by the courts by allowing the bill to operate despite the right to collective bargaining granted by the Canadian Charter of Rights and Freedoms. The legislation was widely condemned, including by opposition parties, the Canadian Civil Liberties Association, Prime Minister Justin Trudeau, Minister of Justice and Attorney General of Canada David Lametti, the Ontario Bar Association, and other unions including those which had previously endorsed the PC Party.

Despite the government's bill, CUPE went on strike anyway, resulting in province-wide school closures and protests in support of education workers. The government challenged CUPE at the Ontario Labour Relations Board. On November 7, 2022, Ford announced that he would rescind Bill 28 and that he would resume negotiations with CUPE. Following the strike, Ford said he did not regret his use of the notwithstanding clause in imposing the contract and said that it helped both sides "come to their senses".

=== Municipal affairs ===
==== Toronto City Council ====
Ford believes that the constitution does not prevent provincial governments from changing the size of municipal councils, even after an election campaign has already begun. After his government's legislation to reduce the number of wards represented at Toronto City Council was ruled unconstitutional, Ford pledged to invoke section 33's notwithstanding clause of the Canadian Charter of Rights and Freedoms which would allow him to bypass the Charter and implement the legislation regardless of the court's ruling. The Ontario Court of Appeal later ruled in Ford's favour and allowed his modification to the council. The matter was further appealed by the City of Toronto and is now under consideration by the Supreme Court.

==== Public transit ====
Ford is a proponent of subways. He believed that the provincial government should assume control over the Toronto subway. In February 2020, Ford and Toronto Mayor John Tory signed a preliminary agreement which would see the province assume "sole responsibility for the planning, design and construction" for Ontario Line, the three-stop Line 2 subway extension into Scarborough, the Yonge North subway extension and the Eglinton Crosstown west extension. In 2020, construction began on the Hurontario LRT line in Mississauga and Brampton, with all of the subway projects beginning procurement or construction by June 2024. Ford has been criticized for refusing to conduct a public inquiry into the delayed Line 5 Eglinton, which opened in 2026.

==== Municipal spending cuts ====
In 2019, the government announced that it would adjust the cost-sharing arrangement for Toronto Public Health and Toronto Paramedic Services resulting in retroactive cuts that would total $177 million a year and $1 billion cut in Toronto over 10 years. The cuts were criticized by City officials including Medical Officer of Health Eileen de Villa, Health board chair Joe Cressy, and Mayor John Tory. The City projected that the additional financial pressure resulting from would result in further cuts to municipal services or increased taxes. Amidst backlash, Ford announced that the province would keep the cost-sharing arrangement and re-evaluate it at the end of the fiscal year.

==== Strong-mayor powers ====
In September 2022, Ford's government passed the Strong Mayors, Building Homes Act that grants extra powers to the mayor of Toronto and the mayor of Ottawa within their mayor–council governments. The Act grants the mayors of Toronto and Ottawa direct control over the drafting of city budgets; the appointments and dismissals of their city managers and department leaders (except police chiefs, fire chiefs, or auditors general); vetoes over laws that may conflict with provincial priorities (which may be overturned if a supermajority of two-thirds of city councillors voted to do so); and the creation and reorganisation of municipal administrative departments.

==== Greenbelt controversy ====
Before Ford was first elected in 2018, a video emerged of him informing developers that he would "open up a big chunk of the Greenbelt" if elected. After a public outcry, Ford said he would replace any removed land and that his goal was to increase supply to reduce housing costs. Pre-election, Ford also pledged not to remove rent control, stating, "I have listened to the people, and I won't take rent control away from anyone. Period. When it comes to rent control, we're going to maintain the status quo." After taking office, rent control for all newly built or newly converted rental units was removed to "encourage builders to build purpose-driven rental apartments." After re-election in 2022, and amidst a worsening housing and affordability crisis, Ford became embroiled in controversy over properties released from Greenbelt protection. One developer had purchased property shortly before the decision was made. A total of 7,400 acres of Greenbelt land was removed, while 9,400 acres of land was added "which have lesser conservation value and were already protected from development through other measures."

Ford has disagreed with criticism regarding his friendships with developers, saying, "no one can influence the Fords". Specifically, he called questions about the optics of developers attending his daughter's pre-wedding party in August 2022, "ridiculous". Ford sought clearance for the event from the Integrity Commissioner in January 2023. In February 2023, the Ontario Provincial Police anti-rackets branch were still looking into complaints about his government's decision to open up a portion of the Greenbelt for development. The OPP asked the RCMP to take over the file in August 2023, in order to avoid any perceived conflict of interest.

On August 9, 2023, the Auditor General released a report on the Greenbelt swap-out which found the government's flawed process had favoured certain developers who stood to earn over $8 billion. The AG also confirmed that alterations to the Greenbelt were not necessary to reach Ontario's housing target and that Housing Minister Steve Clark's chief of staff "failed to consider environmental, agricultural and financial risks and impacts". Calls from the opposition for Clark to resign were resisted by Ford and Clark himself, but Clark's chief of staff stepped down. At the end of August, Ontario's Integrity Commissioner found Clark had broken ethics rules, and on September 4, Clark tendered his resignation and was replaced by Paul Calandra. The following day, Ford reiterated he would follow 14 of the Auditor General's 15 recommendations but would proceed with allowing the construction of affordable homes under $500,000 for "newcomers and young people" on the Greenbelt. He also stated more applications to remove land from the Greenbelt would be reviewed. He did not answer a reporter's question about reinstating rent control, nor did he comment on calls from First Nation Chiefs across Ontario to return traditional territories to the Greenbelt.

On September 20, another minister from Ford's cabinet, Kaleed Rasheed, resigned over his relationship with a developer involved in the Greenbelt land swap. The next day, Ford announced that after continuous backlash from constituents and two reports regarding the flawed process of opening the Greenbelt he would reverse his decision to open the Greenbelt to development. He apologized to the people of Ontario and promised to encourage building within urban boundaries.

On October 10, the RCMP announced it was opening a criminal investigation into the allegations around developer favouritism in the Greenbelt land swap process used by the province of Ontario.

On October 16, Minister Calandra tabled a bill that would restore the Greenbelt lands removed in 2022 and that any future changes to the Greenbelt would have to go through the legislature.

In August 2023, the Toronto Star filed for an FOI to Ontario's Integrity Commissioner to make the emails of Ryan Amato, Steve Clark's former Chief of Staff, available to the public. In April 2025, the Integrity Commissioner ruled in favour of the Toronto Star's request. Due to the ruling, Amato has until June 11, 2025, to provide his emails or an affidavit attesting no such emails exist.

==== Bicycle infrastructure ====
In September 2024, it was reported that the Ford government was working on legislation to restrict the construction of new bike lanes that would require the removal of lanes for motor vehicles. While speaking with reporters, he stated his belief that bike lanes increased congestion and emergency vehicle times (though the City of Toronto has disputed that claim), and that they should be built on side streets rather than major arterial roads. In October 15, Ford announced that any such lanes would require provincial approval to be built, and that municipalities would need to demonstrate that the lanes would not have a "negative impact on vehicle traffic". He also announced that he would remove bike lanes from some arterial streets, such as Bloor Street, Yonge Street, and University Avenue in Toronto.

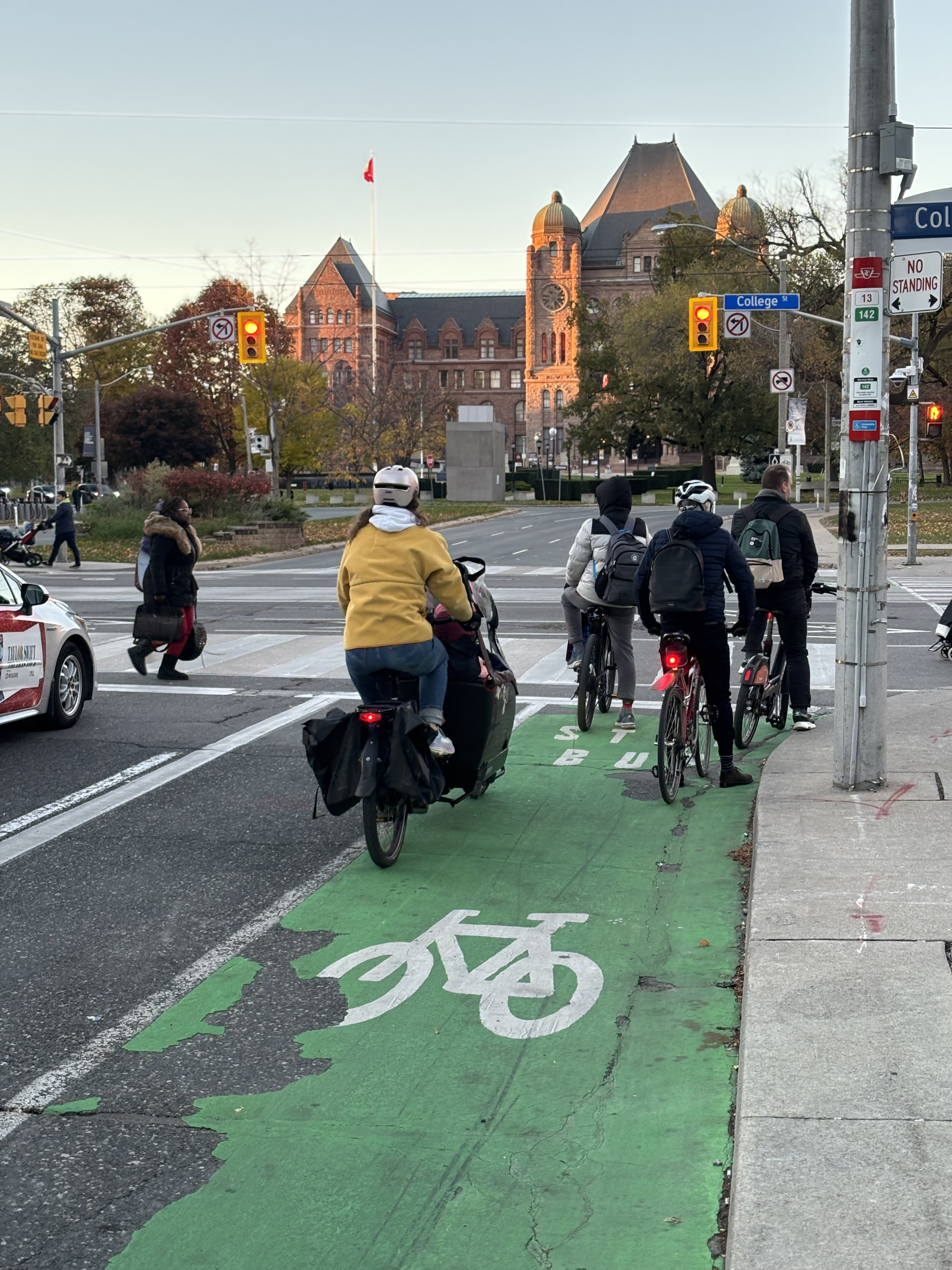
Cyclists using the bicycle lane on University Avenue, November 2024. One of the bicycle lanes targeted for removal by the legislation.

This bill, named the Reducing Gridlock, Saving You Time Act also shielded the government from any lawsuits related to cyclist deaths, and passed on November 25, 2024. When Toronto bureaucrats estimated that the removal of the bike lanes would cost approximately $48 million, Ford called their estimate "hogwash" and reiterated his claims that the bike lanes were responsible for traffic congestion. A court challenge was launched on December 11 to stop the removal of the Toronto bike lanes. In July 2025, an Ontario court ruled that removing Toronto bike lanes was unconstitutional on the basis that doing so would endanger life; the government appealed the decision, and in August 2026, the Ontario appeals court ruled that there is no constitutional obligation to regulate the use of roads in any particular manner, allowing Ford's government to remove Toronto bike lanes. On October 13, the applicants announced their intention to appeal to the Supreme Court of Canada.

=== Energy ===
During his election campaign Ford had promised to lower Ontario's electricity rates by 12 percent. During his campaign, in April 2018, he announced that in order to reduce electricity rates, he would redirect the province's dividends from partial ownership of Hydro One to subsidize market electricity rates, as well as absorbing the cost of conservation programs currently paid for by consumers, at an estimated cost of $800 million per year.

Ford attacked Hydro One CEO Mayo Schmidt, calling him "Kathleen Wynne's $6-million dollar man" in reference to his reported annual salary, and called on the utility's board of directors to resign. Ford vowed to fire them all if elected, although PC energy critic Todd Smith later clarified that the government cannot dismiss Hydro One's CEO directly. He opposed his predecessor's decision to privatise Hydro One, but does not plan to reverse the decision. His government passed legislation to publicly disclose and reduce the salaries of Hydro One's board members and executives. On July 11, 2018, Hydro One CEO Mayo Schmidt resigned along with the entire board.

According to Bloomberg News, by December 5, 2018, Washington Utilities and Transportation Commission, the state's regulators, rejected Hydro One's $3.4 Billion takeover of Avista because of "political risks in Ontario ... from provincial leaders who may not have the company's well being in mind". Bloomberg also reported that, if the merger was not approved by the state's regulators, Hydro One would have to pay the CA$138 million break fee. Because Hydro One is partially owned by the Ontario government, Ontario ratepayers would also be paying the "Parent Termination Fee". Ford denies that he is to blame for the U.S. regulators' decision.

Ford has invested in nuclear energy technology in Ontario, with plans to build a small modular reactor (SMR) at Darlington Nuclear Generating Station announced in 2020.

=== Political patronage controversies ===
In July 2018, Ford hired Rueben Devlin, former PC Party president and a Ford family friend, as a health-care advisor at a salary of $350,000 plus expenses, more than Ford's own salary of $208,974.

In December 2018 Bob Paulson, who served as a Royal Canadian Mounted Police (RCMP) officer for 32-years including as RCMP commissioner before retiring in 2017, called for an independent third-party inquiry into Ford's appointment in December 2018 of Toronto Police Superintendent Ron Taverner, who is a long-time friend of Ford, as the new commissioner of the Ontario Provincial Police. By March 2019, Taverner had stepped down following "months of controversy" that "triggered an integrity commissioner investigation".

A June 20, 2019, article in the Toronto Star said that Ford had awarded "plum patronage posts to two political allies". He hired Jag Badwal as Ontario's agent-general to Britain and the United States with an annual salary of $185,000. Ford named Earl Provost as Ontario's agent-general to Chicago.

On June 28, 2019, Ford's chief of staff, Dean French, resigned "amid a patronage scandal". According to a Globe and Mail article, French resigned "after it was revealed that two people with personal ties to [French], 26 year-old Tyler Albrecht and Taylor Shields were appointed to lucrative positions in New York and London. The Toronto Sun reported in a June 27, 2019, article that 26-year-old Tyler Albrecht, who had a "thin resume", was proposed for a "job that paid $165,000 a year, plus housing and other expenses" as Ontario's "new trade rep in New York City". His qualification was "that he played lacrosse with French's son". TVO's Steve Paikin cited the example of Taylor Shields, who is French's wife's cousin, who was appointed as the trade representative in London, England, with a salary of $185,000 plus expenses. Just hours before French resigned, Ford had cancelled Albrecht's and Shields' appointments. Thomas Staples, who played on St. Michael's College Varsity Lacrosse team with French as coach, worked in the office of Bill Walker, who was chief government whip. When Walker became minister of government and consumer services in November 2018, Staples worked as his executive assistant and legislative affairs advisor. According to iPolitics, Staples had not completed his undergraduate studies, and had neither the qualifications nor work experience in politics. French's niece, Katherine Pal, who had been appointed as Ontario's Public Accounts Council resigned after her family ties to French were revealed. According to Paikin, Pal was well qualified to be Public Accounts Council but she resigned because of the bad optics. On July 4, Peter Fenwick, who served as Ontario's first "strategic transformation adviser" since November 2018, was fired when it was revealed in an interview with The Star that "Fenwick has been a life insurance customer of French's for at least 20 years". On July 10, Andrew Suboch, a "personal injury and insurance lawyer" who had served as chair of the Justices of the Peace Appointments Advisory Committee (JPAAC), informed the JPAAC that he was resigning immediately after an article in the Globe revealed that Suboch was another of French's "long-time" friends whose sons played lacrosse together for many years.

=== Ontario Place and Ontario Science Centre controversy ===
In 2021, Ford released his vision for Ontario Place. This park used to be an amusement park before being shut down in 2011, and was due to be revitalized. Ford's revitalization plan included a new spa, adventure park, and expanded stage. However, an auditor general report released in December 2024 called the revitalization 'not fair, transparent or accountable,' noting that "since 2019, the estimated public cost of redeveloping Ontario Place has increased by $1.8 billion to a total of $2.2 billion."

The private spa is to be built and operated by Therme, an Austrian spa company. Its construction requires the clear-cutting of Ontario Place's West Island, a process which has bulldozed over 850 trees. The Ontario government is also obligated to build a substantial parking component for the spa at taxpayers' expense (even as an expanded GO train station and a new subway line are being built nearby). The cost to provide this parking is at $400 million as of May 2024. Per the auditor general report, other bids would have privately funded this parking, with 3 of the 10 bids also providing a public park as well as the funding the parking lot. The auditor general also raised concerns the bidding process for Ontario Place fell short of “typical procurement law or directives” for the province, with the government giving itself the right to select bids that failed to meet its own criteria.

In 2024, the Ontario government closed down the Ontario Science Centre due to a report suggesting that the roof tiles of the science centre could collapse without repairs. However, the company that originally built the science centre said that the building does not need to be shut down, and offered to fix it. Now-Nobel laureate Geoffrey Hinton pledged $1 million to help rebuild the science centre, but this did not stop the Ford government's plan: the science centre will still be moved to Ontario Place in 2029 at the earliest, and into a space that is 50% smaller than the previous one. The updated budget in 2024 pushed the cost to build the new, smaller science center to $1.4 billion, compared to $1.3 billion for maintaining it at its current location. As of Fall 2024, parts of the Science Centre's contents are scattered around malls in the GTA for temporary exhibits.

On April 16, 2025, The New York Times published an investigation revealing that Therme Group, the company behind the planned spa and wellness facility at Ontario Place, had misrepresented itself during the bidding process. The report found that Therme falsely claimed to operate multiple spa facilities across Europe, when in fact it had only run a single location in Romania. The investigation also raised concerns about the company's financial health and the fairness of the provincial government's contracting process. Doug Ford has since called for a review into the procurement of the Ontario Place contract by Therme Group.

The total cost of the Ontario Place redevelopment is $2.2 billion as of 2024, up from around 400 million predicted in 2019.

=== COVID-19 pandemic ===
==== Initial outbreak ====
In December 2019, an outbreak of coronavirus disease 2019 (COVID-19) was first identified in Wuhan, Hubei, China; it spread worldwide and was recognized as a pandemic by the World Health Organization on March 11, 2020. The first confirmed case in Canada was in Ontario—reported on January 27, 2020.

On March 17, Ford declared a state of emergency in Ontario, closing bars and restaurants (with the exception of take-out and delivery services), as well as libraries, theatres, cinemas, schools and daycares and all public gatherings of more than 50 people (later reduced to 5 people on March 28). Furthermore, the government announced on March 17 that Ontario had "some evidence of community transmission" of COVID-19.

On March 23, Ford announced that all "non-essential" businesses be ordered closed starting 11:59 p.m. On March 24, Ford also stated that schools would remain closed past the original April 6 opening date (on May 19 it was announced that schools would remain closed until the following school year in September). A list of 74 "essential" businesses was published later in the day on March 23.

On March 25, Ford and Finance Minister Rod Phillips introduced a $17-billion response package that includes an influx of cash for the health sector, direct payments to parents and tax breaks for businesses.

==== Third wave ====
On April 9, 2021, Ford received his first dose of the AstraZeneca COVID-19 vaccine at a local pharmacy in Toronto, and encouraged eligible Ontarians to get vaccinated.

Amid growing case numbers in mid-2021, the government moved to introduce a third province-wide stay at home order. As part of the response, Ford announced on April 16, 2021, that outdoor amenities including playgrounds would be closed, and that he would be authorizing police to require pedestrians and drivers to explain why they are not at home and provide their home address and other relevant details. The regulations raised concerns about a re-legalization of carding. The government experienced significant backlash with the new enforcement measures, with some commentators – such as the National Post's Randall Denley, a former PC politician – equating the province to a "police state" Members of the Ontario COVID-19 Science Table described the new restrictions as "absolute madness", and not based on science questioning the need to restrict "safe options from people as you do nothing to impact the places where the disease is spreading". After dozens of police services across the province announced that they would refuse to enforce the new measures, Ford promptly rolled back the new enforcement provisions the next day and reopened playgrounds, while keeping other outdoor amenities closed.

Over the weekend following the introduction of new orders, calls for Ford's resignation over his handling of the COVID-19 crisis grew, In April 2021, Ford revealed that he had been in isolation following contact with one of his staffers, who had contracted COVID-19. Ford announced on April 30, 2021, that he had asked the federal government to stop international students from coming into the province in an effort to curb the third wave.

==== Omicron variant ====
During the emergence of the Omicron variant of COVID-19 in December 2021 and January 2022, Ford's government announced in December 2021 new restrictions on indoor settings. After growing calls for third or booster doses of COVID-19 vaccines, the government allowed all Ontarians over 18 years of age to receive a third dose on December 20, 2021.

On January 3, 2022, Ford announced that Ontario would be moving into modified Step 2 on January 5, closing indoor dining, gyms, movie theatres and schools. These restrictions were lifted on January 31. What followed was the end of all vaccine mandates on March 14, the end of most mask mandates on March 21, and the end of all COVID-19 measures (including the remaining mask requirements) on April 27.

On September 7, 2023, the Ombudsman of Ontario's Investigation into the Ministry of Long-Term Care's oversight into long-term care homes through inspection and enforcement during the COVID-19 pandemic was released. The report detailed the collapse of the LTC inspection system and how the Ministry failed to protect residents by ceasing inspections for the first 7–12 weeks of the pandemic, and by only applying low-level enforcement action for serious infractions. It noted that the Fixing Long-Term Care Act, which came into force in April 2022, could help long-term care homes to be better prepared for future pandemics.

==== Bill 124 ====
Bill 124 was a law that limited salary increases for the public sector and for agencies and commissions that received over $1 million in provincial funding by one percent for three years-from 2020 to 2023.

The bill attracted opposition from nurses, which became more significant during the pandemic. Nurses reported that low morale, alongside double workloads, extra hours, and unbearable conditions in the workplace. In contrast, Doug Ford has repeatedly praised nurses for the essential work they are providing during the pandemic, calling them "heroes on the front-line".

After a lawsuit was launched in 2021 by a coalition of ten unions, the Ontario Superior Court of Justice struck down the bill on November 29, 2022, saying that "the law infringes on the applicants' rights to freedom of association and collective bargaining." The Court of Appeal for Ontario upheld the ruling.

=== Tunnel under Highway 401 proposal ===
In September 2024, premier Ford said his government would explore a tunnel for drivers and public transit under the Highway 401, with a feasibility study to follow. According to Ford, it would "be one of the world's longest tunnels". In February 2025, he made it one of his re-election pledges. Experts, however, pointed out that the roughly 55 km tunnel would likely cost $50–130 billion and not solve the congestion problems. The media called it "the single-most expensive Ontario election promise in the last 10 years".

In May 2025, Doug Ford included the Highway 401 tunnel proposal on his letter to Prime Minister Mark Carney, describing it as one of the "nation-building projects". The proposal was heavily criticized by opposition politicians. Leader of the Official Opposition Marit Stiles called it "outrageous and ridiculous", while Liberal Leader Bonnie Crombie said that the "40-year project" could bankrupt the province.

In August 2025, documents obtained by CBC News revealed that the Ministry of Transportation and Infrastructure Ontario, with an outside engineering consultant, had already analyzed three tunnel and two elevated expressway concepts for the Highway 401 corridor after unsolicited proposals from Aecon, Cintra and Acciona, but the unreleased study was paused in late 2021 "based on government direction".

=== Trump tariffs ===
In January 2025, Ford began to state that he would need a "clear mandate" from voters to respond to the tariffs on Canadian imports to the United States threatened by new President Donald Trump, calling the 2025 Ontario general election. Ford was caught on video saying that on the day of the 2024 U.S. presidential election he was "100% happy" that Trump won, until Trump threatened tariffs on Canada. During the election campaign, his party promised to invest $10 billion in cash-flow support for Ontario employers, $3 billion in payroll tax and premium relief, $120 million to support approximately 18,000 bars and restaurants, $40 million for a new Trade-Impacted Communities Program, $300 million to expand the Ontario Made Manufacturing Investment Tax Credit, and $600 million for the Invest Ontario Fund.

Ford also advised the newly sworn in prime minister, Mark Carney, on strategies to mitigate the trade war, and appeared on multiple American news shows. Ford later met with Prime Minister Carney to discuss Trump tariffs. He also signed agreements to reduce inter-provincial trade barriers with other provinces and territories.

In October 2025, Ford launched an ad campaign in the United States criticizing the tariffs. The ad featured a clip of former American president Ronald Reagan from 1987 warning against the economic impact of trade wars.

In August 2026, amid another escalation of the trade war, Trump signed an executive order to rename the Lake Ontario waters bounded by the U.S. to "Lake America", which was rejected by Ford and other Canadian officials.

=== Purchase and sale of private jet ===
In April 2026, the Toronto Star reported that the Ford government had purchased a $28.9 million Bombardier Challenger 650 private jet, intended to be used for transportation of the premier. Previously in 2019, Ford stated that he "refuses to use the premier’s plane" – the province maintains a fleet of two Beechcraft King Air planes for transporting the premier, lieutenant governor and members of cabinet.

The Challenger jet purchase was subsequently criticized heavily by the opposition and public, with the aircraft being nicknamed the "gravy plane". After several days of heavy scrutiny, Ford announced that the government would sell the jet "as quickly as possible".

=== Elections ===
==== 2022 ====
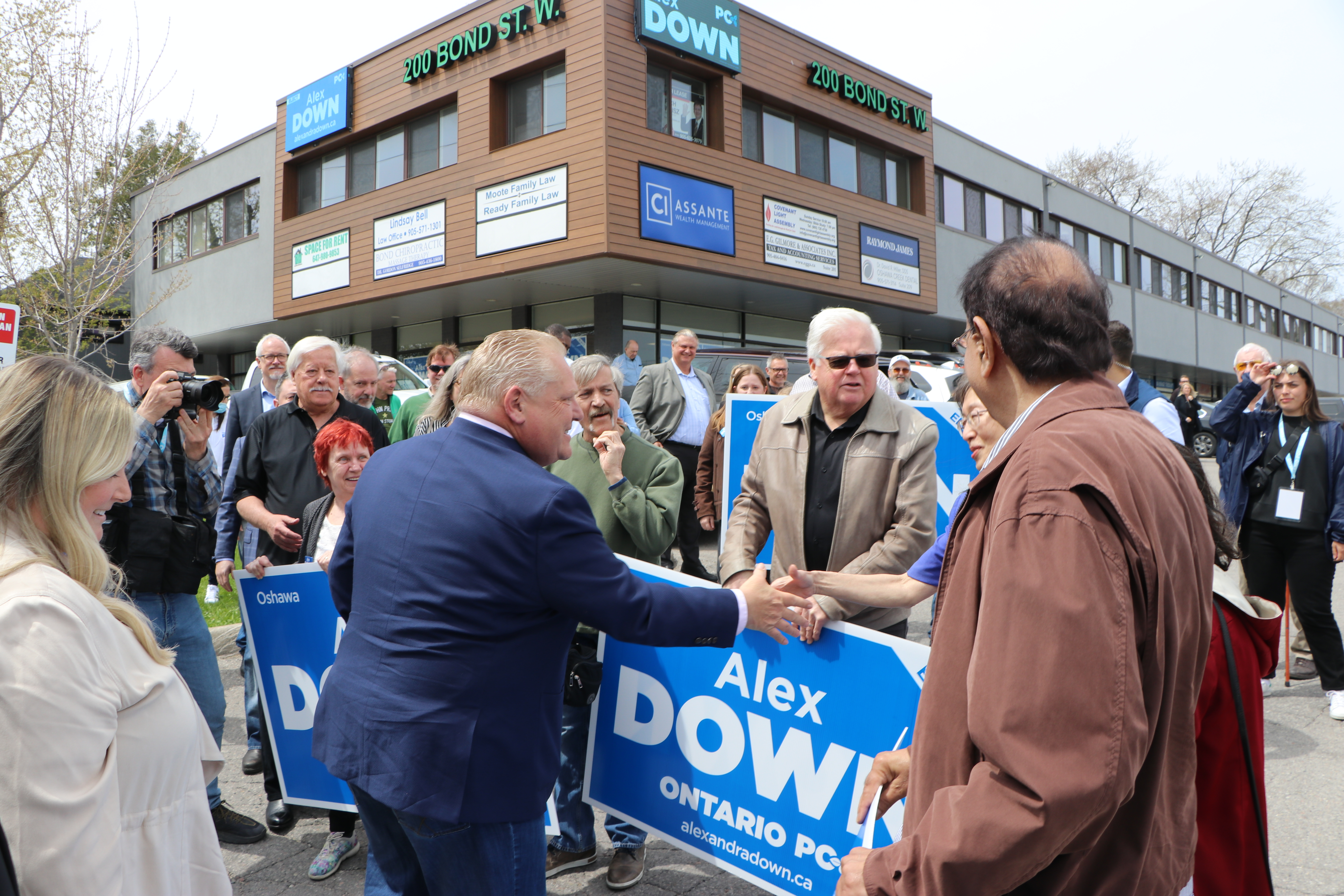
Ford attending a campaign rally in Oshawa, May 2022

In late April 2022 – days before the election call – the PC government released its budget, promising to implement it if the government was reelected. The budget recorded a deficit of $19.9 billion and promised substantial spending on infrastructure (including for their proposed Highway 413) and tax breaks for some workers and seniors. On May 3, 2022, Premier Doug Ford met with the Lieutenant Governor of Ontario to advise dissolution of the legislature and for writs of election be drawn up. Ford led the Progressive Conservatives to another majority government in the 2022 provincial election. The PCs gained seven more seats than they had won in 2018, with an increased share of the vote. The election set a record for the lowest voter turnout in an Ontario provincial election, as only 44.06% of the people who were eligible voted.

==== 2025 ====
Ford's party won a third majority with 80 seats in the 44th Ontario general election. Originally scheduled by fixed election laws to be held by June 4, 2026, Ford triggered an early provincial election, called a snap election, for Feb 27 after meeting with Ontario's lieutenant-governor. It is speculated that this was to take advantage of a lead in the polls and fundraising, as well as a desire to hold the election before the next federal election. Speculation that Ford would call an early election began in 2024 and was further fuelled by Ford refusing to commit to the June 2026 date when asked by reporters at multiple press conferences in May 2024. The possibility of a trade war was expected to be the main election issue.

The Progressive Conservatives led by Ford were reelected with a third consecutive majority government, the first premier to do so since 1959, though with a slightly smaller majority compared to 2022. The Liberals finished over ten percentage points ahead of the NDP in the popular vote, but only gained five seats compared to before the election (albeit this was enough to regain official party status for the first time since 2018), with Bonnie Crombie (the leader of the Ontario Liberal Party) being defeated in her riding. The NDP therefore remained the official opposition, despite losing a small number of seats and finishing a distant third in the popular vote.

== Political positions ==
Although Ford's rhetoric and policies were characterised as conservative early in his political career, since 2020, political commentators have noted a shift to the political centre and a more cooperative attitude toward the federal Liberal government.

Ford has called pro-Palestinian protests in Ontario during the Gaza war "hate rallies".

Doug Ford frequently gives out his phone number to random people and uses his personal phone for government purposes. In 2024, the Information and Privacy Commissioner of Ontario ruled that Doug Ford had to release logs of his phone calls. In March 2025, he told people not to text him at night, complaining "all I hear is the buzzing."

=== Relationship with other conservatives ===
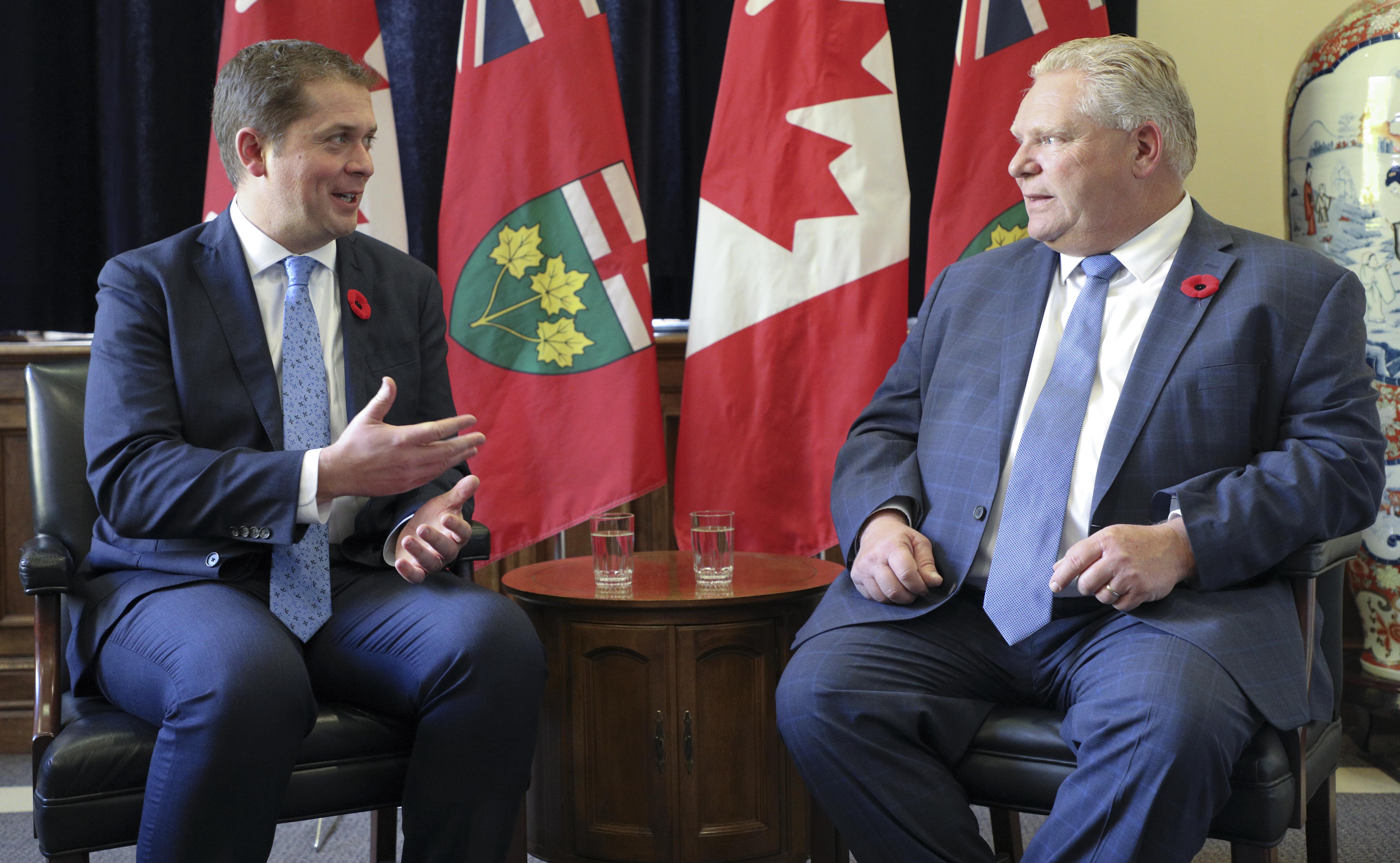
Ford with Andrew Scheer, former leader of the Conservative Party of Canada

In federal politics, Ford supports the Conservative Party of Canada and several provincial conservative parties, including the Alberta United Conservative Party. However, federal Conservative leaders Andrew Scheer and later leader Erin O'Toole attempted to distance themselves from him. Ford did not campaign for O'Toole during the 2021 federal election campaign. He had a brief meeting with federal Conservative leader Pierre Poilievre in 2025; Ford criticized Poilievre's failed 2025 federal election campaign and his campaign manager, Jenni Byrne, who formerly served as Ford's principal secretary.

In 2018, Ford endorsed the economic policies of the Republican Party and the presidency of Donald Trump in the United States, saying his support for Trump is "unwavering". After Trump announced tariffs on Canadian aluminum imports in August 2020, Ford expressed his disapproval, calling Trump's policy "totally unacceptable". After the 2024 United States presidential election, Ford congratulated Trump and said it was "time to bet big" on Ontario–US relations. However, after Trump announced 25% tariffs on Canada, Ford renounced his support for Trump. In October 2025, an ad from the Ontario government authorized by Ford ran in the United States. The ad quoted former United States President Ronald Reagan and his opposition to Tariffs. This ad upset Donald Trump, who subsequently ended all trade talks with Canada and applied an additional ten per cent tariff on the entire nation. Ford went on to say the ad was effective in part because it upset President Trump. After Trump announced 50% tariffs on Canada, Ford said he could "kiss my ass," which sparked a response from Trump on Truth Social.

=== Relationship with the federal government ===
In 2018 and 2019, Ford was seen as a staunch critic of the federal government of Liberal Prime Minister Justin Trudeau. Ford opposed the Trudeau government's imposed carbon tax and urged voters to vote out the Trudeau-led Liberals in the 2019 federal election.

However, since 2020, journalists have noted a change in Ford's attitude toward the Trudeau government, with Ford stating he was not a partisan politician in that year. In April 2020, Susan Delacourt of the Toronto Star wrote Ford "forged an unlikely friendship" with Deputy Prime Minister Chrystia Freeland when combatting the COVID-19 pandemic; in August of that year, Ford praised Freeland's appointment as finance minister. In March 2022, John Ibbitson of The Globe and Mail wrote that there was a "political bromance" between Ford and Trudeau. In October 2022, Ford said he supported the Trudeau government's invocation of the Emergencies Act in response to the Canada convoy protest.

In January 2026, Ford publicly criticized a trade agreement between Prime Minister Mark Carney and Chinese President Xi Jinping. He characterized the deal as a "terrible" and "knee-jerk reaction," asserting that it was implemented without consultation with the Canadian automotive industry. Ford referred to the Chinese vehicles as "subsidized spy cars," citing potential cybersecurity and national security threats. Otherwise, he has praised Carney's leadership, a working relationship noted by political commentators as a stark difference from Ford's criticism of Trudeau.

=== Relationships with municipal leaders ===
Ford had a brief feud with Patrick Brown, the mayor of Brampton and former PC leader, leading to Ford cancelling the chair of Peel Region. They later made peace by 2020.

Ford stated he had a positive relationship with Olivia Chow shortly after she became mayor of Toronto, after previously calling her "an unmitigated disaster". Ford stated in the same interview that during an election "you throw some mud back and forth", also highlighting that he has a "phenomenal relationship" with one-time political rivals Andrea Horwath and Steven Del Duca.

Ford actively supported the two Toronto mayoral campaigns of his brother Rob Ford and former Toronto police chief Mark Saunders.

== Personal life ==
=== Family ===
Ford and his wife Karla (née Middlebrook) have four daughters: Krista, Kayla, Kara, and Kyla.

In 2018, Ford's sister-in-law Renata Ford, through his late brother, Rob, sued Doug and Randy for mismanagement of Rob's estate, saying their actions deprived her and her children of due compensation while overseeing business losses at Deco Labels totalling half of the company's market value. In response, Doug alleged that the claims and the lawsuit's timing in the same week as the 2018 Ontario election amounted to extortion.

Ford's mother Diane died from cancer in January 2020.

=== Health ===
Ford became an "ethical vegetarian" after working in a meatpacking plant as a teenager, and while this is no longer the case, he was still not eating red meat as of 2011. Ford, who is obese, has struggled with his weight at least since 2012, when he publicly attempted a weight loss challenge. Ford is occasionally fat shamed in the media, having been previously called "unfashionably overweight". Ford is a teetotaler.

On January 8, 2025, Ford was unharmed after an OPP vehicle he was travelling in was involved in a collision on Highway 401.

=== Philanthropy ===
In 2014, Ford and his mother donated $90,000 to Humber River Hospital, where Rob Ford was receiving care.

=== Bibliography ===
A book by Doug and Rob Ford titled Ford Nation: Two Brothers, One Vision – The True Story of the People's Mayor appeared in 2016.

== Electoral record ==
=== Municipal election record ===
2010 Toronto election, Ward 2
Candidate	Votes	%
Doug Ford	12,660	71.68
Cadigia Ali	2,346	13.28
Luciano Rizzuti	828	4.69
Rajinder Lall	736	4.17
Andrew Saikaley	637	3.60
Jason Pedlar	455	2.58
Total	17,662	100.00

2014 Toronto mayoral election
Candidate	Votes	%
John Tory	394,775	40.28
Doug Ford	330,610	33.73
Olivia Chow	227,003	23.15
64 other candidates	7,913	2.84
Total	980,177	100.00

=== Ontario PC Party leadership election ===
2018 Progressive Conservative Party of Ontario leadership election
Candidate	Ballot 1		Ballot 2				Ballot 3			
Name	Votes	Points	Votes	Change	Points	Change	Votes	Change	Points	Change
Christine Elliott	23,237; 36.28%	4,187; 34.13%	24,138; 37.99%	901; 1.71%	4,394; 35.82%	207; 1.69%	32,202; 51.74%	8,064; 13.75%	6,049; 49.38%	1,655; 13.56%
Doug Ford	20,363; 31.80%	4,091; 33.35%	27,812; 43.77%	7,449; 11.97	5,652; 46.08%	1,561; 12.73%	30,041; 48.26%	2,229; 4.49%	6,202; 50.62%	550; 4.54%
Caroline Mulroney	11,099; 17.33%	2,107; 17.18%	11,595; 18.25%	496; 0.92%	2,221; 18.11%	114; 0.93%	eliminated			
Tanya Granic Allen	9,344; 14.596%	1,882; 15.34%	eliminated							
Total	64,043	12,267	63,545	−498	12,267	0	62,243	−1,302	12,251	−16

=== Provincial election record ===
2018 Ontario general election: Etobicoke North
Party	Candidate	Votes	%	±%
Progressive Conservative	Doug Ford	19,055	52.48	+29.94
New Democratic	Mahamud Amin	9,210	25.37	–0.30
Liberal	Shafiq Qaadri	6,601	18.18	–27.47
Green	Nancy Kaur Ghuman	1,026	2.83	+0.40
Libertarian	Brianne Lefebvre	414	1.14	–
Total valid votes		36,306	98.89	
Total rejected, unmarked and declined ballots		407	1.11	
Turnout		36,713	50.58	
Eligible voters		72,580		
Progressive Conservative notional gain from Liberal		Swing		+15.12
Source: Elections Ontario

2022 Ontario general election: Etobicoke North
Party	Candidate	Votes	%	±%	Expenditures
Progressive Conservative	Doug Ford	13,934	55.51	+3.02	$80,899
Liberal	Julie Lutete	5,884	23.44	+5.26	$61,441
New Democratic	Aisha Jahangir	3,290	13.11	–12.26	$20,065
Ontario Party	Andy D'Andrea	782	3.12	–	$6,413
Green	Gabriel Blanc	690	2.75	–0.08	$301
New Blue	Victor Ehikwe	391	1.56	–	$10,802
People's Political Party	Carol Royer	132	0.53	–	$950
Total valid votes		25,103	99.22	–	$105,547
Total rejected, unmarked and declined ballots		198	0.78	–0.33	
Turnout		25,301	33.98	–16.60	
Eligible voters		74,449			
Progressive Conservative hold		Swing		▼1.12	
Source: Elections Ontario

2025 Ontario general election: Etobicoke North
Party	Candidate	Votes	%	±%
Progressive Conservative	Doug Ford	15,426	59.40	+3.89
Liberal	Julie Lutete	7,369	28.38	+4.94
New Democratic	Bryan Blair	2,067	7.96	–5.15
Green	Chelsey Edwards	526	2.03	–0.72
Ontario Party	Andy D'Andrea	405	1.56	–1.56
New Blue	John Gardner	177	0.68	–0.88
Total valid votes		25,970	99.19	
Total rejected, unmarked and declined ballots		212	0.81	+0.03
Turnout		26,182	34.12	+0.14
Eligible voters		76,734		
Progressive Conservative hold		Swing		–0.52
Source: Elections Ontario

Order of precedence
Preceded by Pierre Moreau as Member of the King's Privy Council	Order of Precedence of Canada as Premier of Ontario	Succeeded by Paul St-Pierre Plamondon as Premier of Quebec
