= Ford Nation (book) =

2016 joint biography of Rob Ford and Doug Ford Jr.

Ford Nation: Two Brothers, One Vision – The True Story of the People's Mayor
- First edition
- Author: Rob Ford; Doug Ford, Jr.
- Language: English
- Genre: Biography
- Published: 22 November 2016 (HarperCollins)
- Publication place: Canada
- Media type: Print (hardcover)
- Pages: 288
- ISBN: 978-1443451758

Ford Nation: Two Brothers, One Vision – The True Story of the People's Mayor is a 2016 biography by Toronto politicians Doug Ford Jr. and Rob Ford.

== Synopsis ==
The book documents the career of Toronto mayor Rob Ford and his councillor brother Doug from their perspective. Development of the book began prior to Rob Ford's death in March 2016.

== Publication ==
The book was released on 22 November 2016.

== See also ==
- Crazy Town: The Rob Ford Story
