= Plug-in electric vehicles in Ontario =

As of October 2021, there were about 67,000 electric vehicles in Ontario. As of 2021, about 3% of new vehicle registrations in Ontario were electric.

== Government policy ==
Purchase incentives for new plug-in electric vehicles were established in Ontario, and consisted of a rebate between CA$5,000 (4 kWh battery) to $8,500 (17 kWh or more), depending on battery size, for purchasing or leasing a new PEV after July 1, 2010. The rebates were available to the first 10,000 applicants who qualify. The province also introduced green-coloured licence plates for exclusive use of plug-in hybrids and battery electric vehicles. These unique green vehicle plates allow PEV owners to travel in the province's carpool lanes until 2015 regardless of the number of passengers in the vehicle. Also, owners are eligible to use recharging stations at GO Transit and other provincially owned parking lots.

This program was discontinued in 2018, and as of April 2022, Ontario does not offer any tax rebates for electric vehicle purchases.

== Charging stations ==
As of April 2022, there were 325 DC charging station locations with 973 charging ports in Ontario.

== Manufacturing ==
Ontario is widely regarded as the primary Canadian hub for electric vehicle manufacturing.

== Public opinion ==
In a poll conducted in 2022 by Clean Energy Canada of Ontario residents, 53% of respondents said they were more likely to buy an electric vehicle than a gasoline-powered vehicle for their next vehicle purchase.

== By region ==
=== Brantford ===
The first electric vehicles in the Brantford municipal fleet were introduced in October 2021.

=== London ===
As of November 2021, there were 20 public AC charging stations in London.

=== Niagara ===
The first electric vehicles in the St. Catharines municipal fleet were introduced in November 2020.

=== Ottawa ===
As of 2019, there were 184 public charging stations in Ottawa.

=== Peterborough ===
The first public charging stations in Peterborough opened in April 2022.

=== Sudbury ===
The first electric vehicles in the Sudbury municipal fleet were introduced in April 2021.

=== Toronto ===
As of May 2022, there were 864 public charging stations in Toronto.

=== Waterloo ===
As of June 2021, there were 2,800 electric vehicles registered in the Regional Municipality of Waterloo.

=== Windsor ===
In 2022, the first electric vehicle battery manufacturing plant in Canada was announced; it will be built in Windsor, and is scheduled to open in 2024.
