= Reducing Gridlock, Saving You Time Act =

Ontario provincial legislation

Legislative Assembly of Ontario
- Long title: An Act to enact two Acts and amend various Acts with respect to highways, broadband-related expropriation and other transportation-related matters
- Citation: S.O. 2024, c. 25
- Assented to: November 25, 2024

Legislative history
- Bill citation: Bill 212
- Introduced by: Prabmeet Sarkaria MPP, Minister of Transportation
- First reading: October 21, 2024
- Second reading: November 7, 2024
- Third reading: November 25, 2024
- Status: Current legislation

The Reducing Gridlock, Saving You Time Act, 2024 (French: Loi de 2024 sur le désengorgement du réseau routier et le gain de temps) is an act of the Legislative Assembly of Ontario relating to road transportation infrastructure in Ontario.

== Provisions ==
=== Highway 413 ===
The legislation expedites the construction of Highway 413. This means that there would not be a full environmental assessment or Indigenous consultation by the time construction started.

=== Bicycle lanes ===
The legislation gives the provincial government significant control over municipal bicycle lanes. It requires the municipalities asking the provincial government for permission over approval to implement bicycle lanes if this would remove a lane for other traffic. Three major bicycle lanes in Toronto are removed under the legislation.

The legislation also ensures that no cyclists could sue the provincial government for injuries sustained due to the lack of a bicycle lane. It stipulates the provincial government will not pay costs for initial bike lane implementation.

== Reception ==
The City of Toronto and the Association of Municipalities of Ontario have criticized the legislation as contradicting other legal obligations on municipalities, such as those relating to mobility besides cars.

In late July 2025, a court ruling declared that the province's plan to remove bike lanes from three streets in Toronto was "unconstitutional". The government appealed the decision, and in August 2026, the Ontario appeals court ruled that there is no constitutional obligation to regulate the use of roads in any particular manner, allowing the removal of the bike lanes.

== See also ==
- Bill 24, similar Nova Scotia legislation
