= James Gardens =

Public park in Toronto, Ontario, Canada

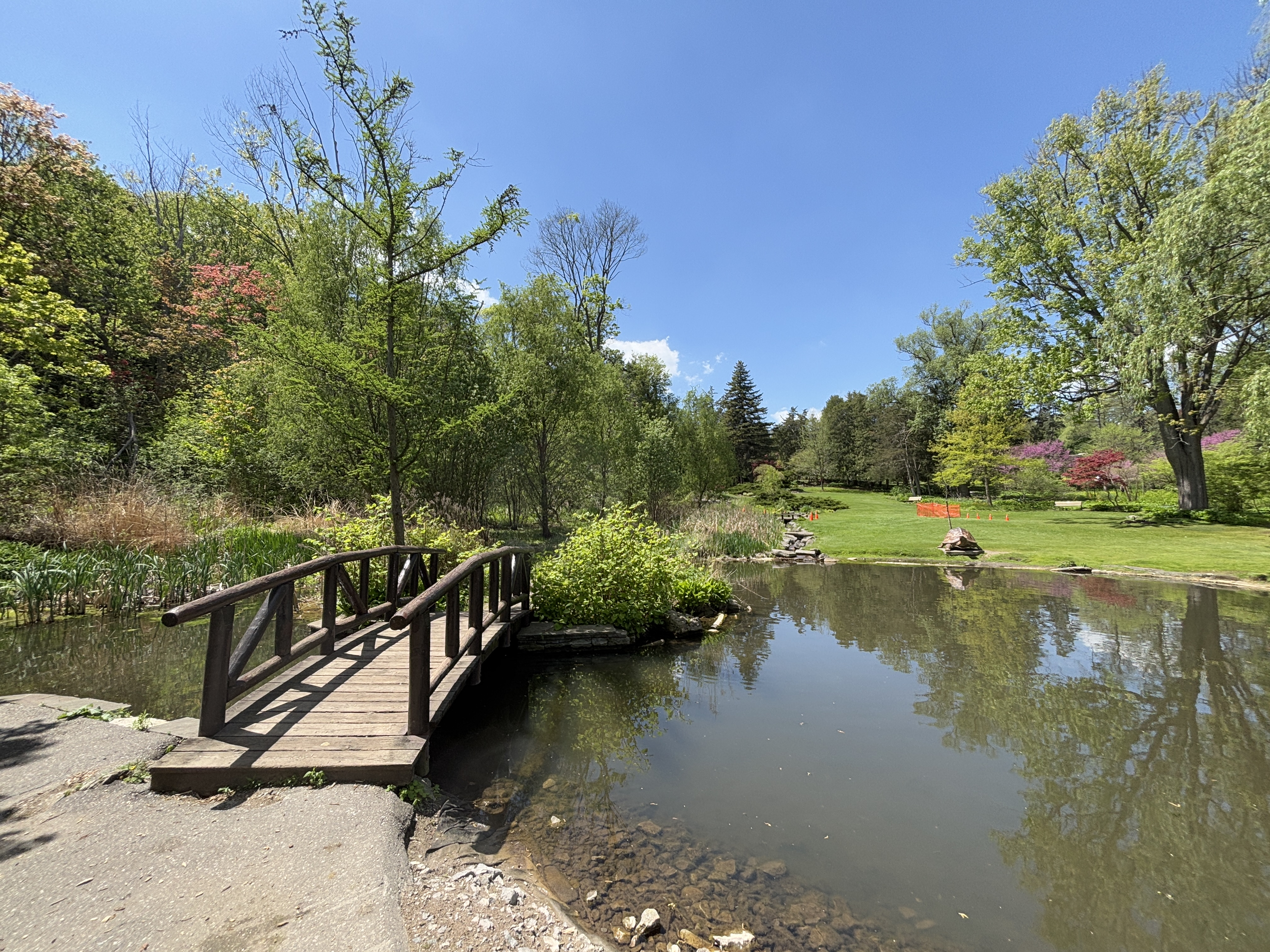
- James Gardens in 2025

- Location within Toronto
- Type: Botanical garden
- Location: 99 Edenbridge Drive; Toronto, Ontario; M9A 3G4
- Coordinates: 43°40′17″N 79°30′48″W
- Area: 21 acres (8.5 ha)
- Created: 1955
- Operator: Toronto Parks
- Website: James Gardens

James Gardens is a public botanical garden in the Etobicoke district of Toronto, Ontario, Canada along the Humber River. It was a former private estate sold to the City of Toronto and is now managed by the Toronto Parks Department.

== Overview ==
James Gardens consists of broad lawns, numerous flower beds, specimen plantings, rock gardens, nature trails, three large and four small ponds fed by a spring and connected by a stream, a carp pool, and a lawn bowling court. It is connected to the Humber River pedestrian and cycling trail.

Each year thousands of flowers and over 75,000 tulips are planted in the beds, whose designs and materials are changed annually in the rock gardens and under the well-pruned trees and shrubs. There are tens of thousands of visitors annually, and many weddings and receptions are held on the grounds of James Gardens.

== History ==
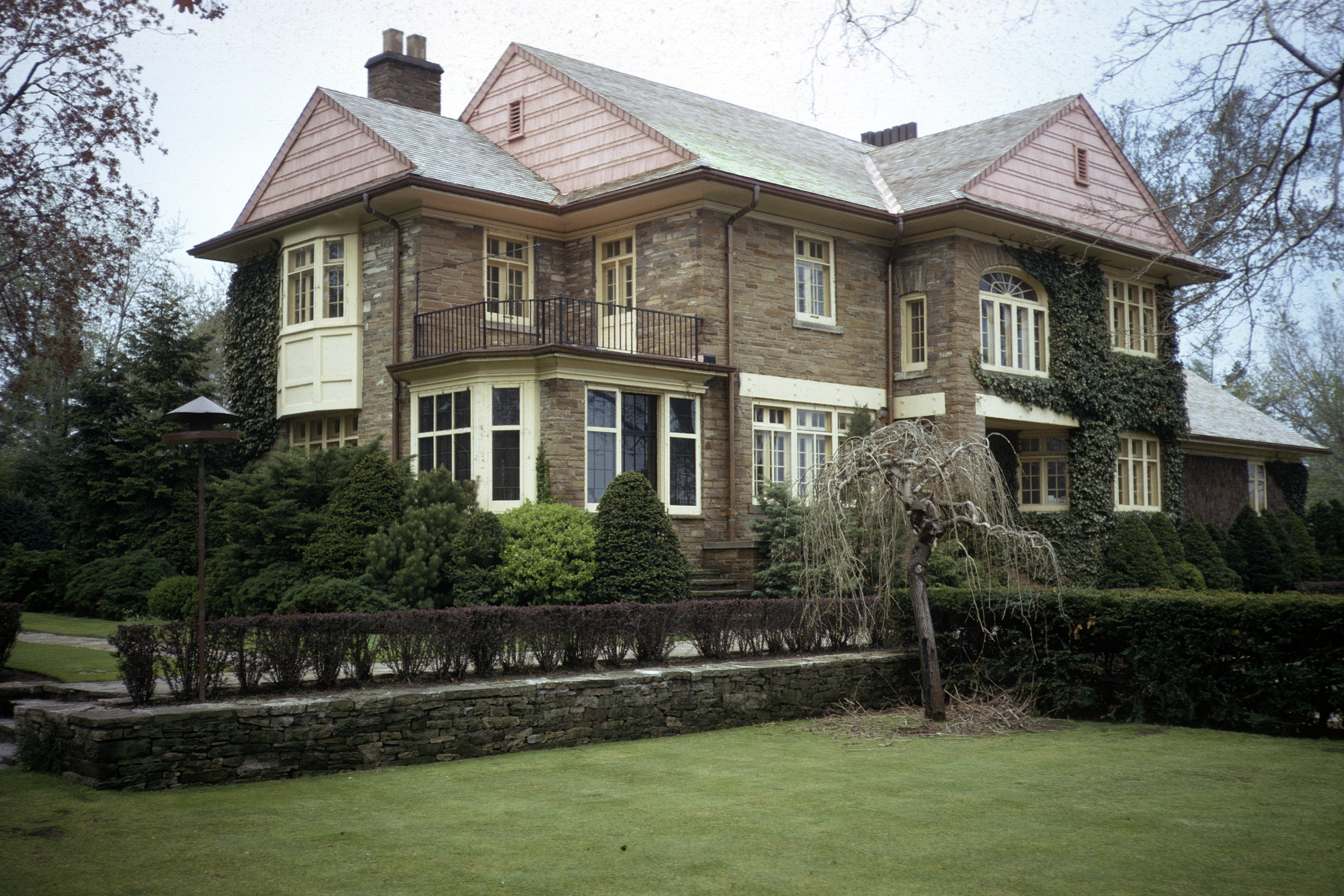
Edgehill House Community Centre in 1974

It was the estate of Mr. and Mrs. Fred T. James. In 1908, Fred James purchased the property from his wife's parents, Mr. and Mrs. Thomas Rumney, as well as the adjoining land from the Home Smith Company. This purchase totalled 21 acres (8.5 ha) of hills, valleys, virgin forest, and bush meadow land on the west side of the Humber River in the area then part of Etobicoke.

The James family lived in a house situated on the top west corner of the estate at Edgehill Road. Preserved to this day, it is a two-story, red-gabled house built of Humber River stone. The building is now a community recreation centre operated by the City of Toronto Parks, Forestry, and Recreation Department. The horse stables were located below the house where the northwest stairs are now. Part of the original wall can still be seen. Various horseshoes, nails, and coins have been found in the flower beds.

In the 1920s, the James family installed weeping tiles and water features. Various First Nations artifacts including spear points were found. These were examined in the early 2000s and dated to be 4,000 years old.

The park was purchased by Metro Toronto for CA$150,000 in 1955 and subsequently operated by its Parks Department.

CBC Television shot scenes at James Gardens for the program "This is the Law", with Paul Soles.

In 2013, Rob Ford, the former mayor of Toronto, lived near the entrance of the park. He was unsuccessful in buying a segment from the Toronto and Region Conservation Authority. An investigation by a Toronto Star reporter led to a night-time confrontation by Ford with the reporter.

It is said to have a gruesome story from the 1900s and haunted by the mother of Fred James. Many have different variations of the story but nothing definite. There is a safe in the basement of the house that the city has not been able to open, and it is said that blood has been detected with technology around the safe.
