= Indigenous fashion of the Americas =

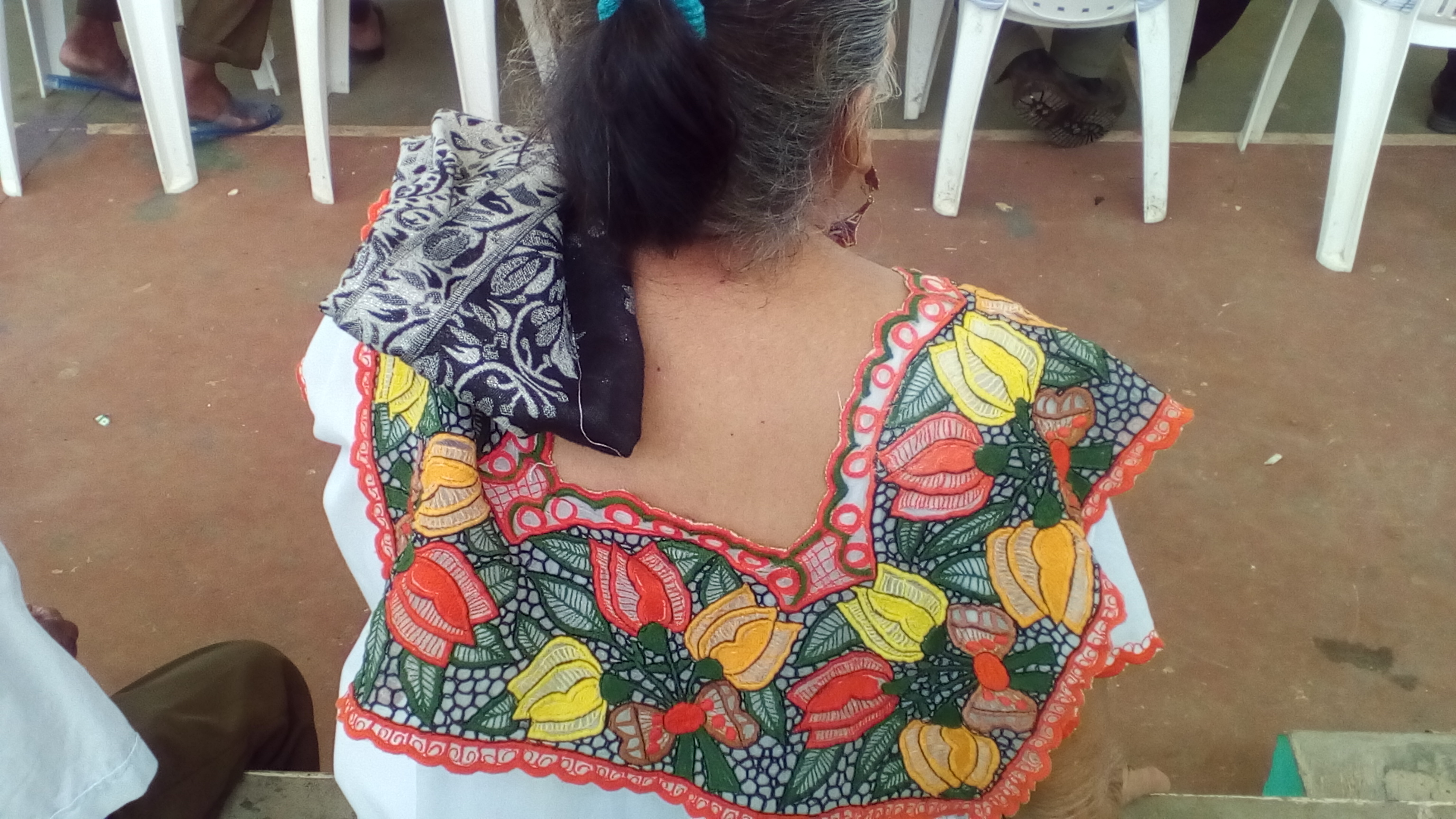
Maya embroidery, Dzibalchen, Campeche, Mexico

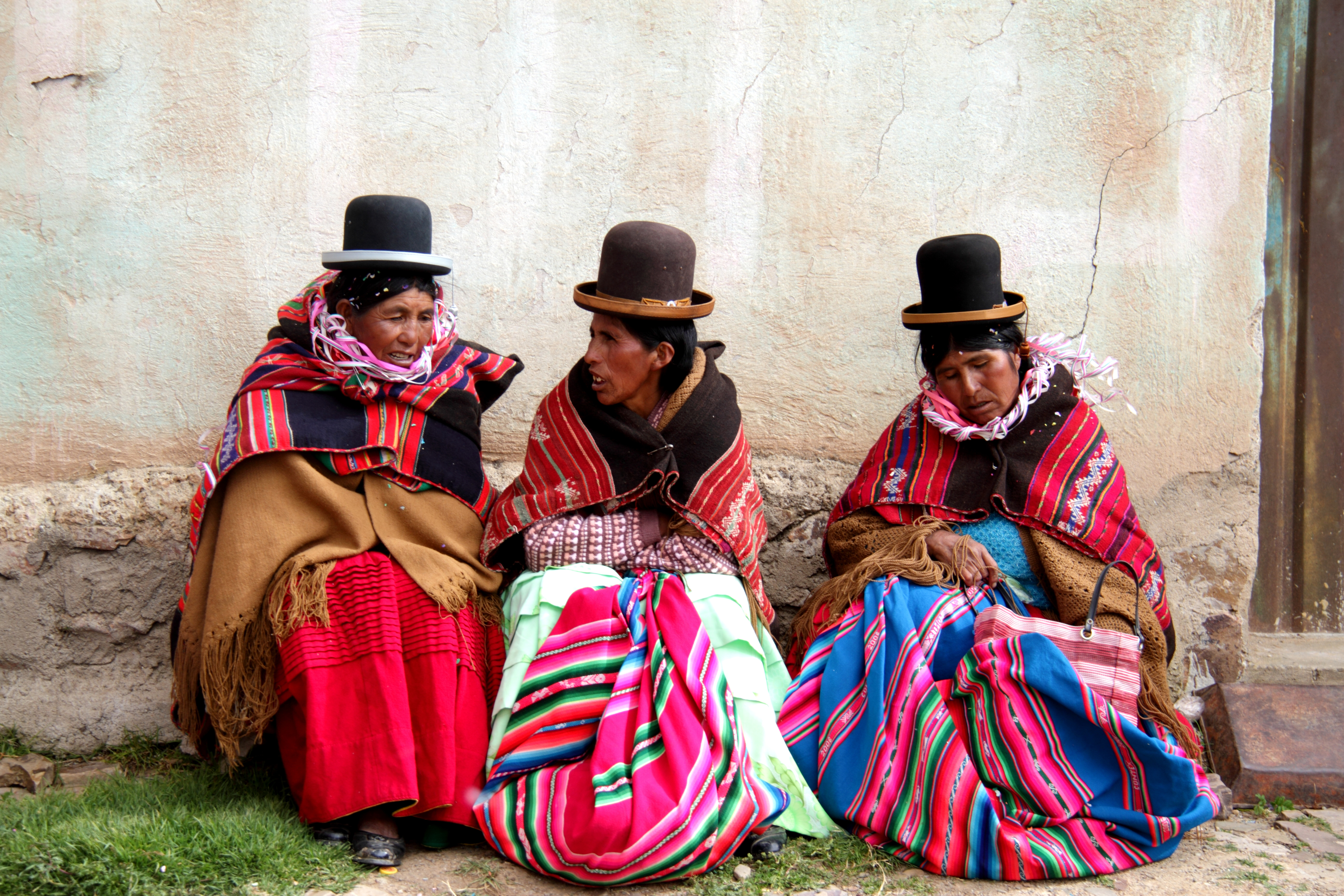
The dress of Aymara women in Bolivia has inspired contemporary Indigenous designers

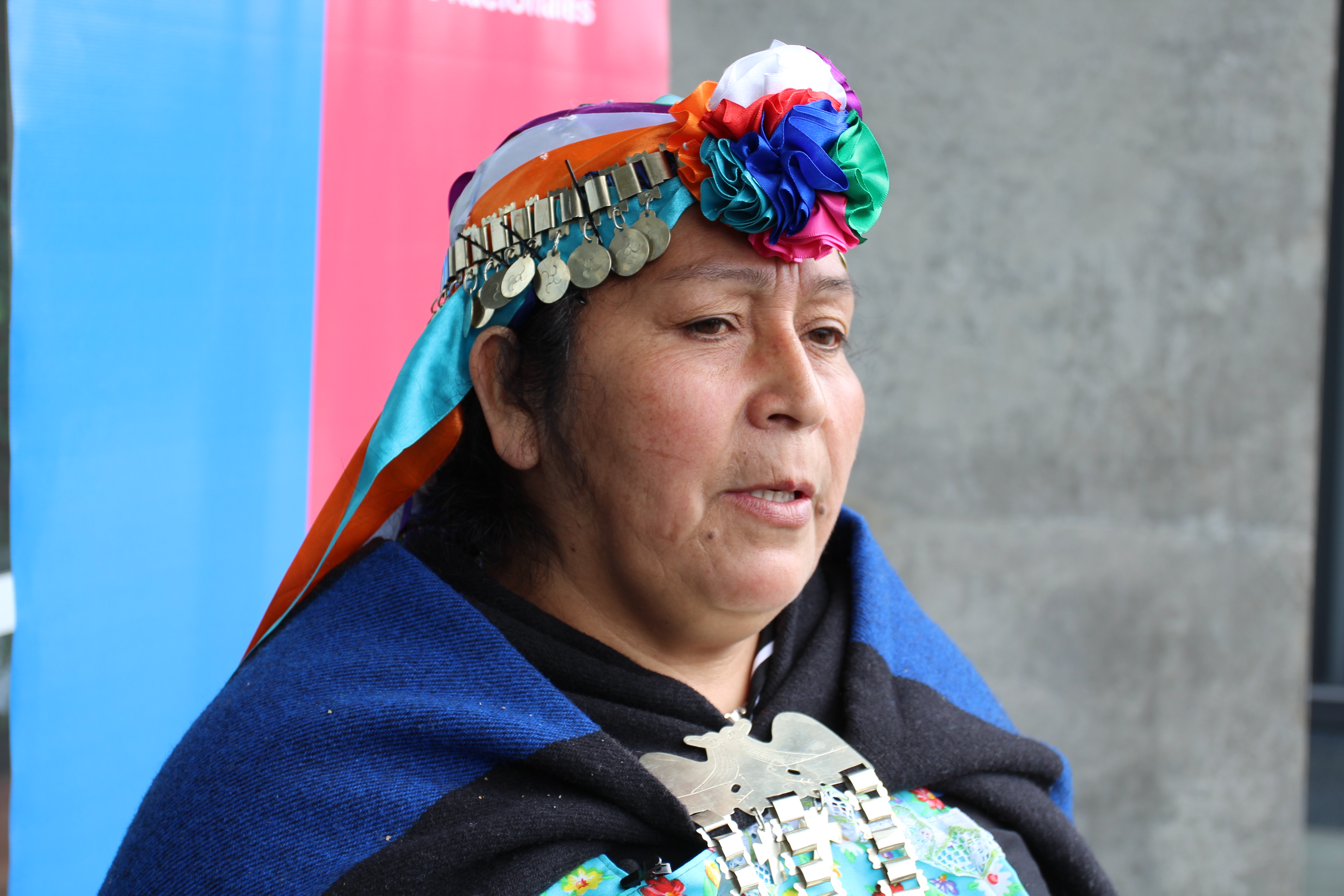
Mapuche fashion in Chile highlights rainbow colors and silverwork unique to their people.

Indigenous fashion of the Americas is the design and creation of high-fashion clothing and fashion accessories by Indigenous peoples of the Americas.

Indigenous designers frequently incorporate motifs and customary materials into their wearable artworks, providing a basis for creating items for the couture and international fashion markets. Their designs may result from techniques such as beadwork, quillwork, leather, and textile arts, such as weaving, twining, and tufting. In some cases, however, they choose not to include any materials associated with Indigenous cultures.

Controversy has emerged over the cultural misappropriation or inappropriate use of cultural heritage and intellectual property by non-Native designers. Respectful use of imagery by mainstream designers who are not Indigenous can help expand appreciation of Native cultures, but plagiarism of design or malapropos use reinforces negative stereotypes and spurs controversy. Similarly, utilizing artisan craftwork can expand awareness if designers are fairly compensated for their work and given credit for their contributions. Contemporary controversies have spurred both crowd-sourced and legislative action to protect the designs and cultural heritage of Indigenous designers.

== History ==
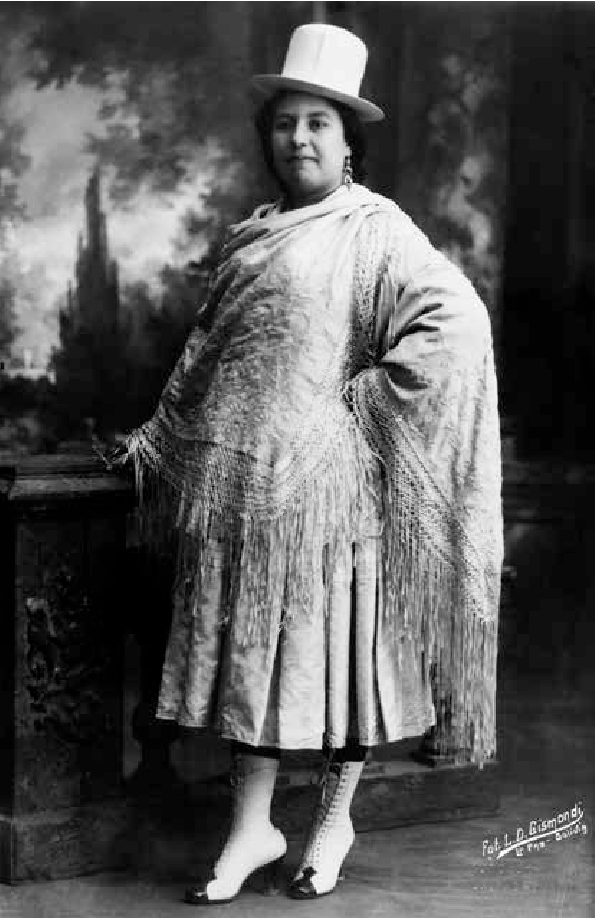
Elegant Aymara woman in Bolivia combined customary Aymaya bowler hat, shawls, and layers of petticoats with high-heeled boats, ca. 1920

=== Mid-20th century ===
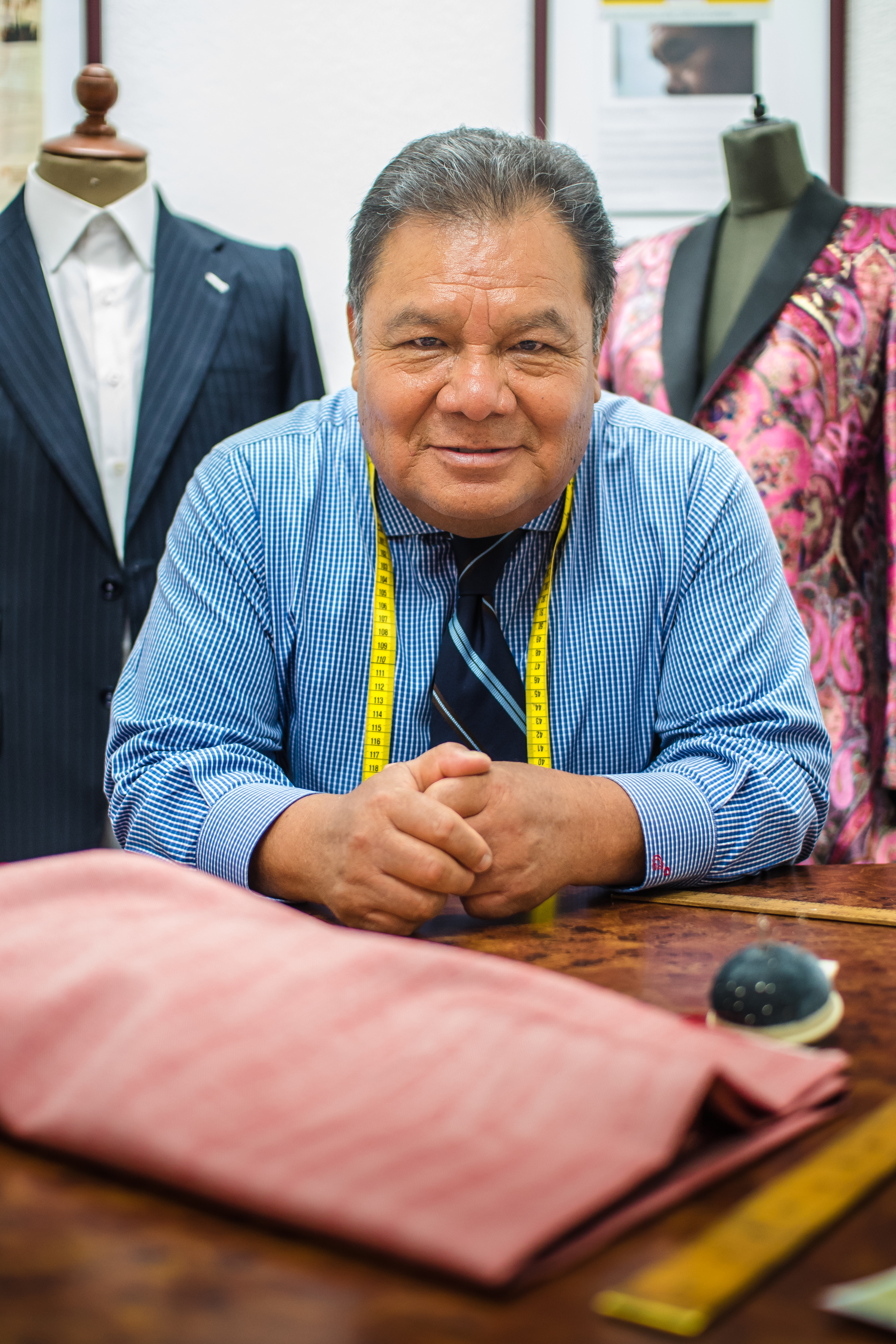
Gilberto Ortiz in 2015.

In Mexico before 1950, many Indigenous communities were isolated and produced their own traditional clothing. As roads improved and people began moving from the countryside to cities, many put aside their traditional clothing, to blend in with their new cosmopolitan neighbors. In 1965, Gilberto Ortiz (Mixtec) moved from San Andrés Lagunas, Oaxaca, to Mexico City and began training as a tailor under German businessman, José Schroeder. Acquiring traditional European styling, his first major client was movie icon, María Félix. In 1978, Ortiz left Schroeder and partnered with the Italian businessman, Edmundo Calanchini. He designed mainly for businessmen and politicians until 1997, when he opened his own shop aimed specifically at the haute couture market. In 2006, at the suggestion of his client Juan Gabriel, Ortiz launched his own label, Gioros, an acronym using the first two letters of each of his names, Gilberto Ortiz Osorio. In 2012, he was named one of the top three tailors in the world by the textile firm Scabal. Typically Ortiz produces classically styled garments using high-end fabrics, but his latest offering in 2017 featured men's and women's jeans.

Sean McCormick (Métis), who began designing footwear in the early 1990s and in 2008, launched Manitobah Mukluks; and Virginia Yazzie Ballenger (Navajo), New Mexican designer, most noted for her "fluted broomstick skirt and matching velveteen blouse".

Since 1995, the Canadian Aboriginal Festival (CANAB) has hosted a fashion show of First Nations designers. Dave Jones (Garden River Ojibwe), began producing an annual fashion show for the Canadian Aboriginal Music Awards (CAMA) in 2001. By 2008, the CANAB Festival featured six fashion shows, as well as booths for designers to exhibit their wares. In 1998, the Denver Art Museum hosted a fashion show, Indian Chic featuring the works of Dorothy Grant, Wendy Ponca, and Margaret Roach Wheeler. It was the first time a major museum had shown works in their collection of Indigenous garments, labeling them as "fashion". Other Native designers of the 2000s include Orlando Dugi (Navajo), Dallin Maybee (Northern Arapaho/Seneca), Connie Gaussoin (Navajo/Picuris Pueblo), the street style of Douglas Miles of Apache Skateboards (San Carlos Apache/Akimel O'odham) and the custom shoes of Louie Gong (Nooksack/Squamish). Dugi is self-taught in fashion, learning to sew, measure and create patterns from online resources. Jamie Okuma (Luiseño/Shoshone-Bannock), another self-taught artist, became the youngest person to earn the Best of Show ribbon at the Santa Fe Indian Market in 2000.

=== 21st-century ===
From the turn of the 21st century, there has been a resurgence in Latin America for Indigenous designs. The trend has been to partner with Indigenous communities of artisans to create fabrics for non-Native designers. In many countries, the Indigenous heritage is seen as part of the national identity and there was little recognition that the design elements non-Native designers used and modified were part of the intellectual property of Indigenous communities. Designers often used remnants of textiles or cut-out embroidery on one garment to use on another. Imitations of Indigenous designs were ordered from labor markets in Asia. After 2010, the trend began to change with slow recognition that original Indigenous designs and designers should be respected. One innovator in this period was Franklin Janeta (Puruhá), of Riobamba, Ecuador, who began working as an embroidery artisan as a child, and in 2000 opened Vispu, a store to market his designs. Modifying traditional clothing styles, he altered components like necklines and sleeve length to create more contemporary fashions. Around the same time, Eliana Paco Paredes (Aymara) of Bolivia began to design fashions based on the traditional costumes of the cholitas, using wool or aguayo fabrics, but fusing them with lace or silk and decorating them with rhinestones and sequins. In 2016, after showing her work at Bolivian Fashion Week, she was invited to participate in New York Fashion Week.

In Ecuador, Lucía Guillín (Puruhá) launched Churandy featuring the dress styles of Indigenous Andes communities with contemporary modifications in 2012. Her clothing lines have expanded to include blouses, jackets, and shorts featuring embroidery patterns and colors typical to the region. The same year, Sisa Morocho (Puruhá) also launched her design company Sumak Churay in Quito, after studying fashion at the Ana MacAulife Institute. Her father's death had prompted her to leave the family hat business and branch out on her own. Using motifs from the Puruhá culture and adorning them with beads, embroidery, and sequins on brightly colored fabrics, she first sold blouses and then became known for dresses. In 2015, Morocho was able to open a second store featuring her designs in Riobamba.

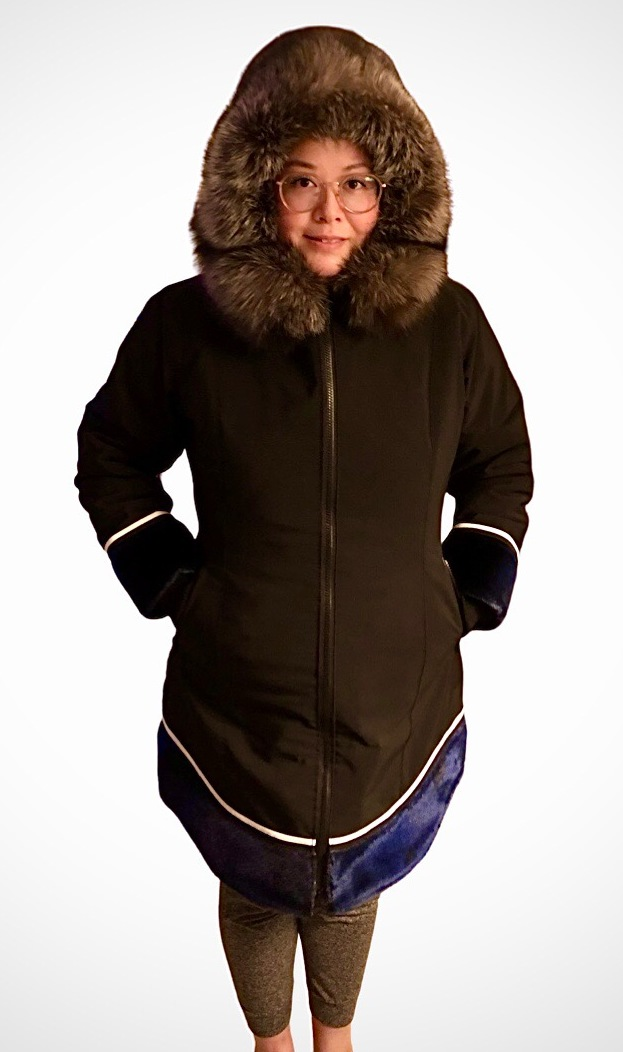
Modern women's parka by Inuk designer Victoria Kakuktinniq, 2021.

In 2013, Victoria Kakuktinniq (Inuit) founded Victoria's Arctic Fashion to market her designs. She creates fur and leather winterwear goods including headbands, jackets, gloves, and parkas, using sealskin and decorated with fox cuffs and embroidery. In 2015, Kakuktinniq won the Business of the Year award from the Nunavut annual trade show.

The Italian designing firm, Ermenegildo Zegna, opened a fashion institute in 2016, in the Azcapotzalco neighborhood of Mexico City with the goal of teaching the techniques of design to Indigenous women. Students enrolled were members of the Mazahua, Nahua, Otomí, Purépecha, Triqui and Tzeltal ethnic groups. The training the women received focused on tailoring techniques rather than on native design elements in an effort to allow the women to move from craftwork into the high fashion market. That same year, Nala Peter (Inuit) began making sealskin bras and panties at the suggestion of her partner, link marketing them online and was invited to participate in the Floe Edge: Contemporary Art and Collaborations exhibition in Nunavut. Another exhibitor at the show was Nicole Camphaug (Inuit), who designs footwear with sealskin and fur heels and vamps.

Vancouver hosted its first Indigenous Fashion Week in 2017 with designs from numerous First Nations designers, including Sho Sho Esquiro (Kaska Dena/Cree), known for elaborately decorated gowns, enhanced with fur, beaver tail, salmon skin, feathers and shells combined with gold trim; Evan Ducharme (Métis), whose work focuses on sustainable and Eco-friendly design and incorporates Métis elements like knotted belts based on fishing net techniques; Jeneen Frei Njootli (Vuntut Gwitchin), who presented a collection using innovative design incorporating fur and hides; Autum Jules (Tlingit), noted for her use of textures and color to reflect the connection between people and the earth; Tyler-Alan Jacobs, (Squamish) whose designs reflect his identity as a two-spirit artist; and Alano Edzerza (Tahltan), known as a multi-media artist whose work incorporates silk-screened images of Native iconography on his garments. Jill Setah (Yunesit'in) participated in the Vancouver event, after having showcased her works at both Oxford Fashion Week and Paris Fashion Week. Tishynah Buffalo (George Gordon), who lives in Alberta, Canada, was invited to participate in London Fashion Week in 2017, to showcase her innovative designs which often use Pendleton blankets and are decorated with beadwork and Cree floral patterns. Helen Oro, (Pelican Lake), who designs fashion accessories, also participated in the event. Oro who has found ceremonial beading constricting, adds beadwork to glasses, headbands, heels and creates jewelry pieces.

First Nations designers, including Sage Paul (Denesuline), launched the first Indigenous Fashion Week Toronto in 2018.

== Legal definitions of Indigenous ==
After the United States passed the Indian Arts and Crafts Act of 1990, public debate in Canada over protection of intellectual property rights became a media topic. There are no Canadian laws that specifically protect against cultural appropriation. The government utilizes international agreements to uphold their fiduciary responsibility to First Nations. As in the US, laws cover communities as a whole and not individual copyright and it is difficult for Indigenous peoples to prevent misappropriation of their names and symbols. Most protections that exist are to protect economic rather than heritage rights. In two cases, trademarks have been obtained to protect Native artists. Since 1959, the "igloo tag" may be used only by Inuit to protect their works. The Cowichan Band Council has registered "Genuine Cowichan Approved" as a mark specifically for clothing designs.

Canada has no specific laws to protect First Nations iconography and Indigenous arts though two trademarks, "igloo tag" and "Genuine Cowichan Approved" have been registered to protect Inuit and clothing designs for the Cowichan Tribes.

In Latin America, legislation is sparse, but some countries or individual states within countries with high Indigenous populations have passed laws to protect Indigenous heritage and design.

== Controversy ==
Non-Native fashion designers have generated controversy by cultural misappropriation of Indigenous designs and other intellectual property. Environmentalists have also targeted some Native designers, especially Inuit, who use fur in their clothing and adornment.

In 1991, D’Arcy J. Moses (Pehdzeh Ki), whose bold colors and designs featuring beaver and other furs were carried in high-end retail stores like Holt Renfrew, Neiman Marcus and Saks Fifth Avenue, signed a contract with the Fur Council of Canada to help them improve their image, drawing anger from anti-fur activists. While the contract provided a steady income, the controversy created a distraction from his work.

In 2017, Parisian designer Christian Louboutin drew criticism for paying Yucatec Maya artisans only 238 pesos (around $13 US) each for bags he sold for around $28,000 pesos (equivalent to $1,550 US). The controversy was sparked when activists called out Louboutin for exploiting the artisans. He paid for all of their materials and paid the workers 478 pesos per day for 6 hours of work, which compares to the average Mexican salary in the region of 80 pesos for 8 hours of work per day. The artisans were thankful for the work and the monies they received, but Louboutin's firm pulled the page advertising the bags from his website. That same year, the Peruvian textile company Kuna withdrew a collection after complaints that the company had misappropriated kené designs from the Shipibo-Conibo people. The controversy motivated Congresswoman Tania Pariona Tarqui to introduce legislation to protect the cultural heritage and symbols of Indigenous communities in Peru.

== Notable Indigenous fashion designers of the Americas ==
- Tammy Beauvais (Kahnawake Mohawk), designed the cape given to Michelle Obama by Sophie Grégoire-Trudeau.
- Tishynah Buffalo - incorporates Cree designs
- Eliana Paco Paredes - Aymara fashion designer

== See also ==
- Textile arts of indigenous peoples of the Americas
- Inuit clothing
