= Indian Relay =

North American sporting event

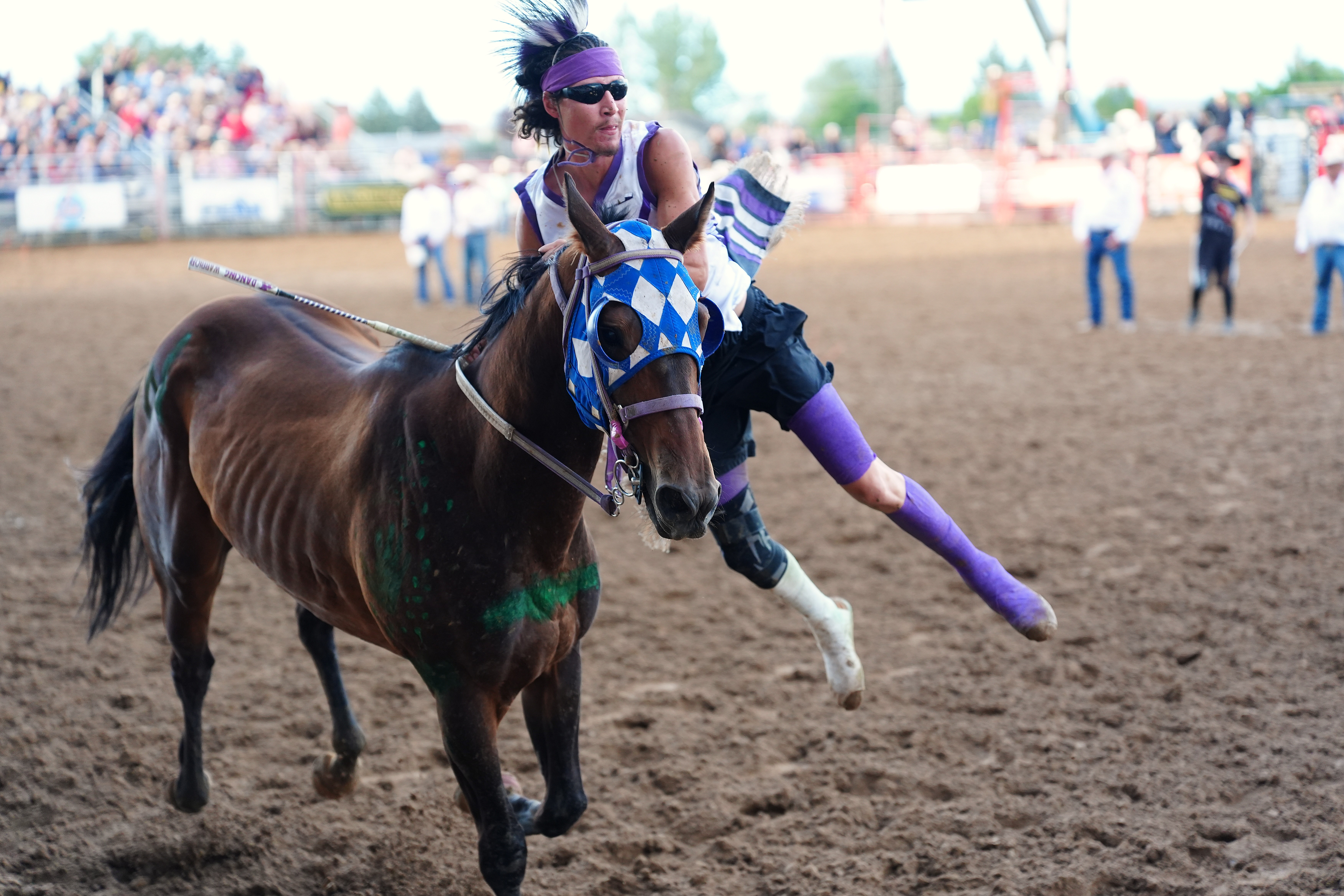
A relay rider switching horses between laps

Indian Relay, also known as Indian relay racing or Indian relay horse racing, is a bareback horse racing sport where teams compete by circling the track while switching horses between laps at full speed. It is largely practiced and sustained by North American Indigenous tribes both across the plains states of the United States and in western Canada, and is often called America’s original or first extreme sport.

== Format ==
Each team consists of three horses and four humans: a rider, a catcher, an exchange holder, and a back holder.

- The rider sprints around the track bareback, then jumps off at full speed to mount a fresh horse
- The exchange holder positions the horse so that the rider can leap on and keep his momentum.
- The catcher, also known as the mugger, runs and grabs the reins cleanly of the incoming horse.
- The back holder steadies the third horse.

At the start of the race, the rider and mugger for each team stand at the starting line with the first horse. When the horn sounds, riders jump on their horses at the line and race a full lap around the track. Then the riders leap off their horse, and jump onto the next horse to run the next lap. The rider rides around the track three times, once for each horse. It’s considered a sport of team work, coordination, and athleticism.

== Divisions ==
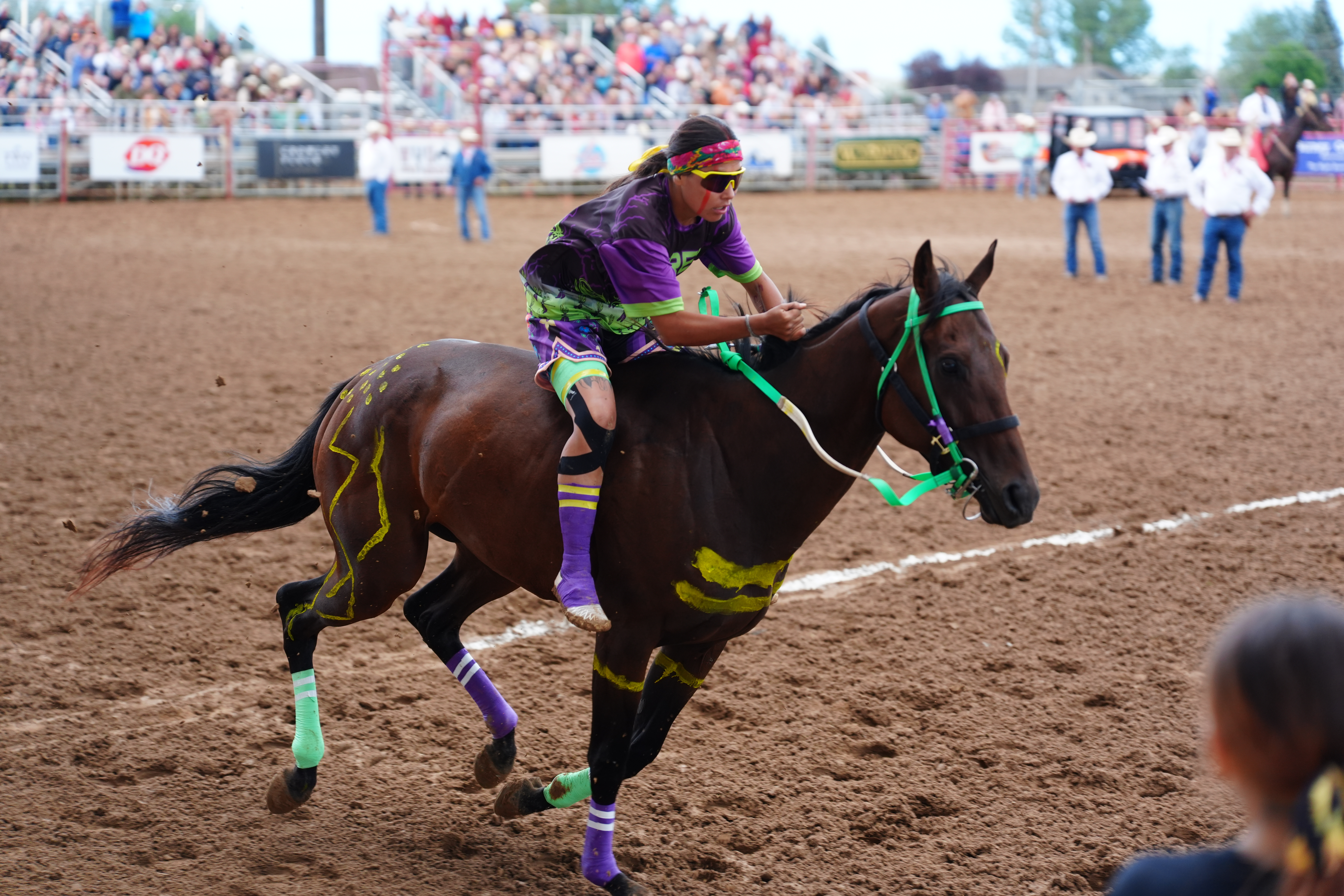
Women’s Indian Relay division at 2026 Sheridan WYO Rodeo

The main marquee races is the men’s division generally consisting of all-male teams. But a number of competitions have added a women’s division, which include only one horse exchange and two laps. There are also a divisions, for youth, kids and junior — some of which use smaller or horses or ponies.

== Attire ==
Apparel is also a core aspect of the sport, with relay teams often wearing garb unique to their tribe or nation. Teams also sometimes paint their horses with patterns and designs.

== Prizes ==
Many competitions have large cash prize pools, such as the 2026 Muckleshoot Gold Cup which offered $85,000 worth of money to winners.

Indian Relay winners are often awarded belt buckles rather than trophies. In addition, some competitions have cash prizes for teams with the best adornments.

== History ==
Indian Relay is a modern evolution of Indigenous horseback riding traditions, which can be traced back at least 300 years to when tribes and First Nations first starting riding horses acquired from the Spanish.

It is unclear what the origins of the modern iteration of Indian Relay is. Ken Real Bird, a well regarded announcer for Indian Relay, says the roots of modern sport lie in the horse-stealing raids that tribes once staged against White settlers and each other. The Shoshone Bannock Tribe in Idaho claims to be the originator of the sport, but others note that horse racing in some form has existed as part of Native American fairs since the early 1900s.

While the event started as a bush-league sport with bragging rights, it has since involved into a competitive sport with sponsorships, drawing audiences of thousands with purses worth tens of thousands of dollars. Today teams go to major racetracks like Churchill Downs, the site of the Kentucky Derby, to buy purebred sprinter horses well-suited to Indian Relay.

The sport is one way indigenous people carry on a long tradition of horseback riding off the racetrack, such as for ceremonial traditions like the Crazy Horse Ride and Little Bighorn Ride.

== Notable races ==
The governing body is the Horse Nations Indian Relay Council, which was founded around 2016.

Among the notable Indian Relay races are

- World Championship Indian Relay which has been part of the Sheridan WYO Rodeo in Sheridan, Wyoming since 1997.
- Indian Relay Championship of Champions, organized by the Horse Nations Indian Relay Council. Most recently in Casper, Wyoming but relocated to Cheyenne, Wyoming in 2026.
- Calgary Stampede Relay Race, which has become one of the biggest draws of the Calgary Stampede since it was added as an event in 2017.
- Pendleton Round-up in Pendleton, Oregon, which have hosted Indian horse races in some form since the early 1910s, The relay event evolved from a half-mile “Indian Race” listed in the first program in 1910 to the first actual relay appearing in rodeo programs in 1913.

== See also ==
- Indian rodeo
