= Omak Express =

Omak Express is an Indian Relay horse racing team based in Omak, Washington whose members come from the Colville Tribes.

== Members ==
The founder and lead rider for the team is Tyler Peasley.

== Awards and honors ==
Omak Express was the first two-time winner of the Muckleshoot Gold Cup.

The team has won the World Championship Indian Relay Race at the Sheridan WYO Rodeo a number of times, including 2021 and 2026.
