= Indian rodeo =

Native American/First Nations rodeo subculture

Indian rodeo is the rodeo subculture of Native-American rodeo athletes and, in Canada, First Nations athletes. In the United States, there are a number of regional associations and at least two national finals. In Canada, Indian rodeos share a major role in small aboriginal communities and are also featured events in larger centres with aboriginal populations. Some major rodeos in British Columbia such as the Williams Lake Stampede are, while not aboriginally-organized and unlike some Indian rodeos open to non-natives, heavily "Indian" in character and in the ranks of competitors.

== Indian rodeos in the United States ==
- The Indian National Finals Rodeo (INFR)
- The All Indian Rodeo Cowboys Association operates in Arizona and neighboring southwestern states.

== Indian rodeos in Canada ==
- Lillooet Lake Rodeo, Mount Currie, British Columbia
- Anahim Lake Stampede, or Anahim Lake Rodeo, Anahim Lake, British Columbia
- Nazko Jamboree, Nazko, British Columbia

== Indian rodeo halls of fame in the United States ==
- Indian National Finals Rodeo Hall of Fame

== See also ==
- Indian Relay
