= All Indian Rodeo Cowboys Association =

Professional sports organization

AIRCA logo

The All Indian Rodeo Cowboys Association (AIRCA) (formerly All Indian Professional Rodeo Cowboys Association) is a Native American organization that promotes Indian rodeo. It sponsors a schedule of local rodeos mostly in Arizona, the Indian Pro Rodeo Tour, leading up to a National Finals rodeo each year in which Native American rodeo performers compete. They cooperate closely with the Central Navajo Rodeo Association (CNRA) and the New Mexico Rodeo Association (NMRA). To compete in the Finals a performer must have competed in at least 30 rodeos during that year.

The Indian National Finals Rodeo (INFR) is a competing national organization and event.

== See also ==
- Rodeo bareback rigging
