= Tyler Peasley =

Competitive horse rider

Tyler Peasley is a competitive horse rider from the Colville Tribes near Omak, Washington.

== Indian Relay ==
Peasley is the founder and lead rider for Omak Express, an Indian Relay team from the Colville Tribes.

== Suicide Race ==
Peasley is a long-time competitor in the famed Suicide Race, a horse race on a steep incline which takes place during the Omak Stampede. He has won five times, earning the title King of the Hill.

He has been injured in the race, one time somersaulting off his horse and being trampled by oncoming riders, resulting in fractured ribs and a broken pelvis and hip.

== Family ==
His father is Larry Peasley and his sister is Naomie Peasley, both of which are competitive riders as well.
