= Indian National Finals Rodeo Hall of Fame =

Hall of Fame for Cowboys

National Indian Rodeo Finals Hall of Fame
- Established: 1976
- Location: P.O. Box 508, Browning, MT 59417
- Type: Hall of fame
- Website: INRFHoF

The Indian National Rodeo Finals Hall of Fame is a hall of fame in Browning, Montana, United States, dedicated to the sport of indian rodeo. The Indian National Finals Rodeo is dedicated to preserving and promoting the sport of Indian rodeo through as many channels as are available to it.

== History ==
The Indian National Rodeo Finals was created in 1976 by five people who took some regional associations to make one larger association. Indian cowboys and cowgirls competed together in the first finals that year in the Salt Palace in Salt Lake City, Utah. The association now claims 11 regions throughout the United States and Canada.

== Inductees ==
The inaugural year of inductees took place in 2011.

2019 Inductees

- Eugene Creighton
- Howard Edmundson
- Allen Fisher
- Pam Hall
- Daniel Susan

2018 Inductees

- Wright Bruised Head
- Yvette Vega
- Ed Hall
- Jack Foreman
- Leonard Williams Sr.

2017 Inductees

- Geneve Tsouhlarkis
- Spike Guardipee
- Britt Givens
- Bob (Tonto) Gottfriedson
- Melvin Joseph Kenton Randall

2016 Inductees

- Levi Black Water Sr.
- Ed Holyan
- Julius Y Begay
- Traci Vaile
- Dee Keener

2015 Inductees

- Dave Best
- Sam Bird
- Kelvin Fox
- Carole Jackson-Holyan
- Jerry Small

2014 Inductees

- Gary Not Afraid
- CL Johnson
- Larry Condon
- Archie Becenti
- Lyle Cochran

2013 Inductees

- Jim Jacobs
- Bud Connelly
- Ervin Watson
- Pete Bruised Head
- John Colliflower

2012 Inductees

- Gracie Welsh
- Josiah Johns
- Harry Shade
- Felix C. Gilbert Sr.
- Howard Hunter Sr.

2011 Inaugural Inductees

- Dean C. Jackson
- Fred Gladstone
- Pete Fredericks
- Bob Arrington
- Jay Harwood
- Mel Sampson

== See also ==
- Indian rodeo
