= Championship of Champions =

Indian Relay race

Tournament information
- Sport: Indian Relay
- Location: Cheyenne, Wyoming
- Dates: September 25, 2026–September 27, 2026
- Established: 2017

The Championship of Champions is the marquee Indian Relay race in North America organized by the Horse Nations Indian Relay Council.

== Eligibility ==
Riders from the United States and Canada compete all summer long in the Tour of Champions to earn entry into the Championship of Champions

== History ==
The first Championship of Champions race took place in 2017 in Billings, Montana. It then took place in Walla Walla, Washington followed by Fort Pierre, South Dakota.

In 2023, the race moved to Casper, Wyoming for a three-year contract.

In 2026, it moved to Cheyenne, Wyoming in part to accommodate the growing demand for the sport.
