= Native American clothing =

Native American clothing may refer to:

- Indigenous fashion of the Americas
- Native American fashion
- Textile arts of the Indigenous peoples of the Americas
- Traditional Native American clothing

== See also ==
- Category:Native American clothing
