= Tishynah Buffalo =

Canadian fashion designer

Tishynah Buffalo is an Indigenous fashion designer from Alexander First Nation in Canada but now residing in Gordon First Nation. Buffalo is perhaps best known for making Pendleton jackets with a modern twist. Her work has been shown at a number of fashion shows such as Fashion Speaks Regina, Western Canada Fashion Week, International Indigenous Fashion Week, and Couture Fashion Week in New York City.

== Personal life ==
Buffalo grew up in Alexander First Nation, Alberta, with her parents, two younger sisters, and younger brother. Buffalo now lives in George Gordon First Nation in Saskatchewan with her husband and two children, Tayvon Lloyd and Lariah Monroe.

As a young teenager, Buffalo noticed the lack of representation of indigenous peoples in the media, specifically in fashion magazines. In an interview with CBC News in Edmonton, Canada, Buffalo said that "[she] wanted to be the one to show the people in the world [Cree] Indigenous creativity."

== Work ==
Buffalo's fashion career started when she began making clothing for her children in 2010, starting with powwow insignia and moving on to creating coats out of Pendleton blankets. With encouragement from others, Buffalo began to make custom designs for customers.

Buffalo's current work consists of mainly designs including the patterns of Pendleton blankets and Cree beading styles.
