= Orlando Dugi =

Navajo fashion designer

- Occupation: Fashion designer
- Known for: Diné (Navajo) fashion design, hand-beaded and embroidered garments

Orlando Dugi is a Diné (Navajo) fashion designer. He is a member of the Navajo Nation, and currently lives in Santa Fe, New Mexico.

== Early life ==
Dugi was raised on his family's sheep ranch on Grey Mountain the Navajo Nation in North-Central Arizona. He learned hand-sewing from his grandmothers at an early age. Later in the 7th grade, he took a home economics class where he learned how to use a sewing machine.

== Work ==
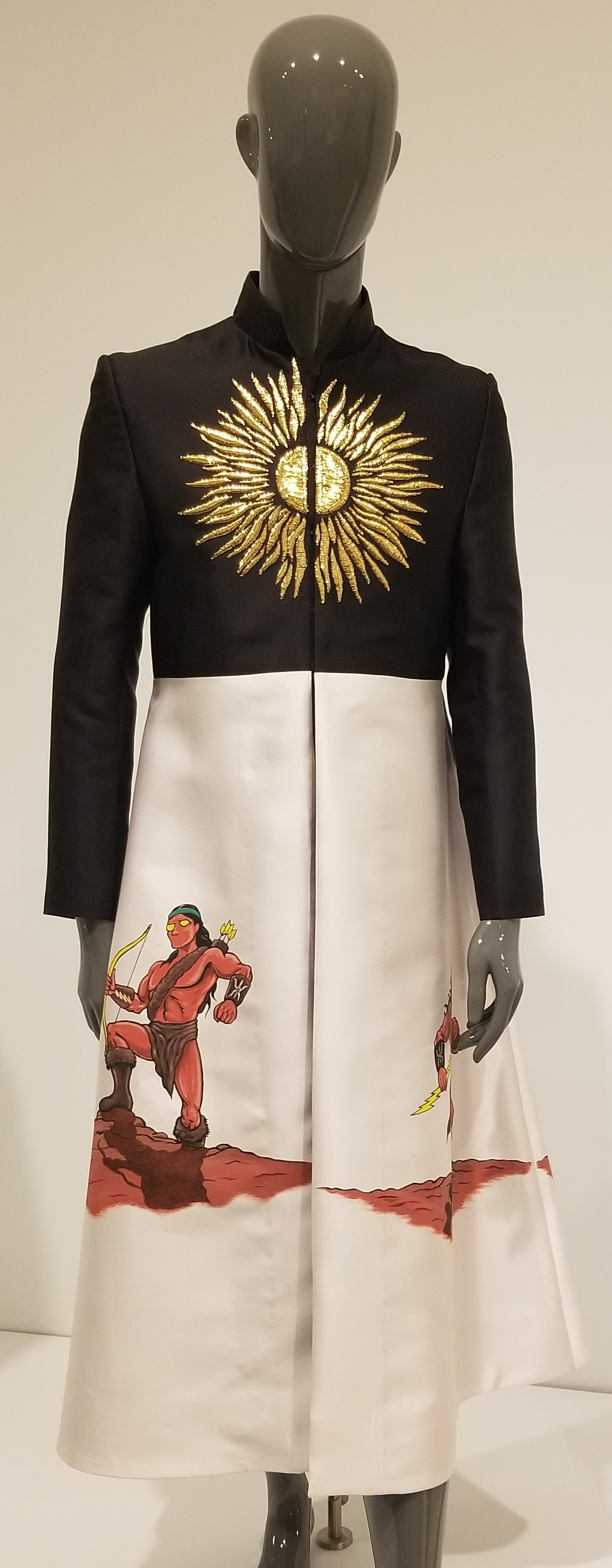
Orlando Dugi, Diné Warrior Twins 2022

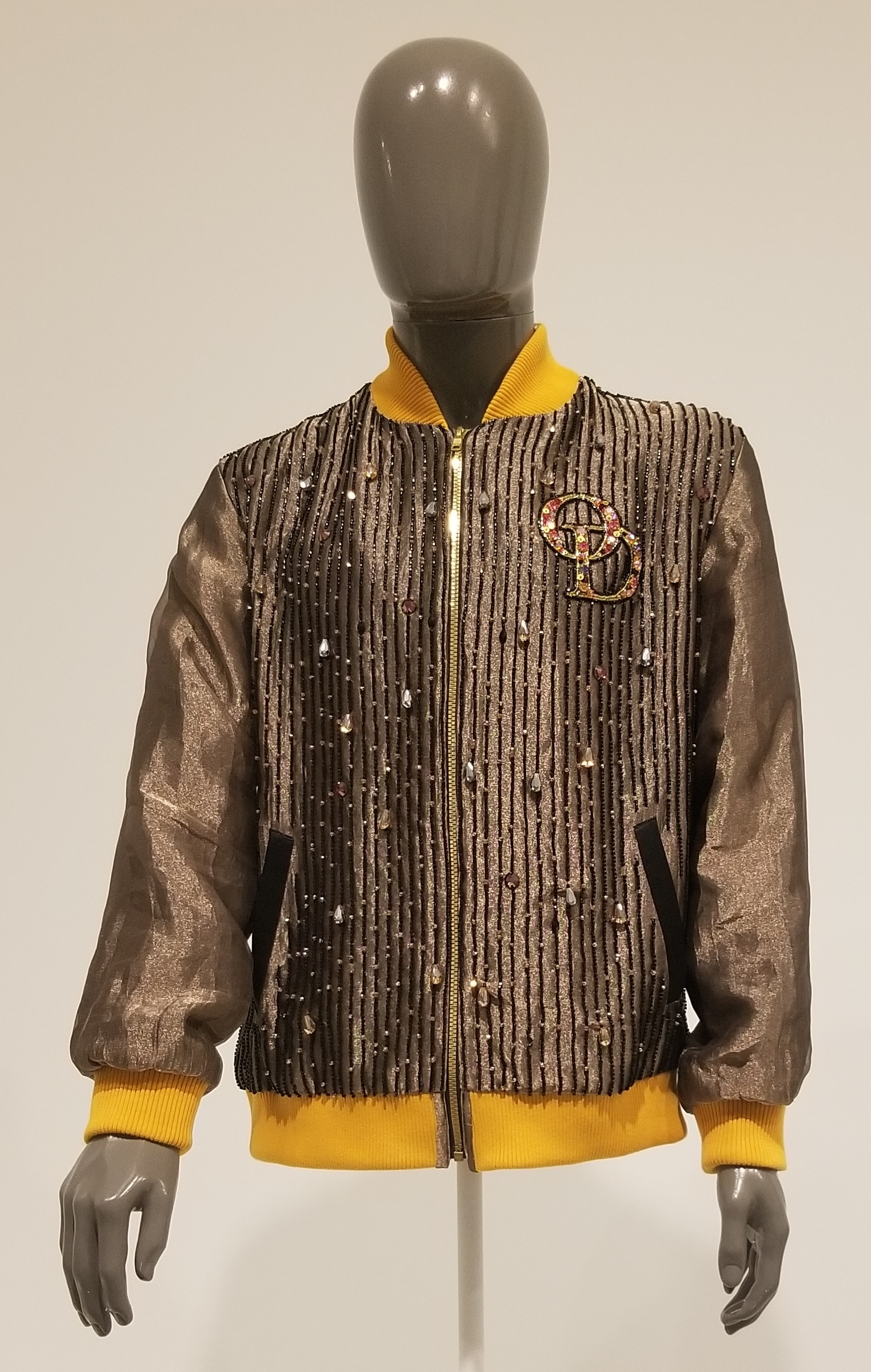
Orlando Dugi, Gold Sun Bomber Jacket 2022

Dugi's work is influenced by both his Diné heritage as well as modernism. His work has been described as expressing "poetic interpretations of cultural teachings and songs without literally encroaching upon them. His fashion designs are often hand-stitched and hand-beaded, embroidered and embellished with feathers, and often incorporate elements of his silversmithing work.

In 2018, Dugi presented his work at Style Fashion Week in New York City, where he "wowed the crowd" with his hand-beaded designs that have been described as "ethereal".

Dugi has exhibited his work at the Autry Museum of the American West in Los Angeles, the Denver Art Museum, the Museum of Indian Arts and Culture, the Wheelwright Museum of the American Indian, the Avenir Museum of Design and Merchandising, among other venues. His work was included in the traveling exhibition, Native Fashion Now, organized by the Peabody Essex Museum.

The Wheelwright Museum of the American Indian published a catalog in conjunction with his exhibition of the same title, It's in the Details: Kenneth Williams and Orlando Dugi.

A documentary film titled, Becoming:Orlando Dugi, was directed by Kaela Waldstein. It has been presented in several film festivals, including the Human Rights Film Festival.

== Awards and honors ==
Dugi has been recognized for his work with awards from the Heard Museum Guild Art Show, the Cherokee Art Show, and the Southwestern Association for Indian Arts, among other honors.

In 2018, Dugi was awarded a two-month long residency at the Museum of the Institute of American Indian Art in Santa Fe, New Mexico.

In 2022, Dugi was named the Rollin and Mary Ella King Fellow, received a Native American Artist Fellowship from the School for Advanced Research. The fellowship supported his research into historic textile techniques and materials. During his time at SAR, he completed a garment inspired by this research as well as research into the Diné and pre-historic Southwestern peoples.
