= Eliana Paco =

Bolivian Aymara fashion designer

Eliana Paco Paredes (born c.1982) is an indigenous Aymara, Bolivian pollera woman fashion designer from La Paz. In 2016, after exhibiting her cholita designs at the Bolivia Fashion Week in June, she achieved recognition in New York City, participating in the September fashion week.

== Biography ==
Originally employed as a secretary in La Paz, Eliana Paco was inspired by her mother, the artisan Cecilia Paredes, to turn to fashion. After receiving the necessary training, she began designing clothes in the local cholita tradition in 2005. As a result of increasing demand for the local style known as chola paceña, she introduced new colours and textures. In 2016, the producer Pierre Dulanto invited her to participate in the September New York Fashion Week. The collection known as Pachamama (Mother Earth) was presented by 12 international models. It was the first time cholita fashions had been shown in New York.

The indigenous pollera women (cholas) in La Paz are known for their bowler hats, mantas (shawls), polleras (skirts) and enaguas (petticoats). Luis Revilla, the mayor of La Paz, was proud to see Paco's designs had been shown at the New York Fashion week. He expressed the hope that "her designs, which reflect the identity of local woman from La Paz, generate a trend in the global fashion industry."

Interviewed for National Geographic, Paco explained that her designs were not only sold at her store in La Paz but were sent to regions throughout the country. They are also exported to other South American countries and to Spain and Italy.
