= Connie Gaussoin =

Navajo and Puebloan jewelry artist

Connie Tsosie Gaussoin
- Born: Connie Tsosie; 1948 (age 77–78)
- Occupation: Silversmith
- Years active: 1969–present
- Known for: Native American jewelry artist
- Style: Tufa-cast silver
- Spouse: Jerry Gaussoin Sr.
- Children: 4
- Parent(s): Carl and Lydia Duran Tsosie
- Relatives: R. C. Gorman, cousin Ramos Duran (War Chief, former governor of Picuris Pueblo), grandfather
- Website: www.tsosie-gaussoin.com

Connie Tsosie Gaussoin (born 1948) is a Diné Navajo and Picuris Pueblo artist, jeweler, and educator. She is the matriarch of the Gaussoin family of Native American artists.

== Background ==
Connie Tsosie was born in 1848 into a prominent family of artists, including silversmiths, painters, weavers, and sculptors. She was one of seven children. Her father Carl Tsosie came from the Navajo reservation in Salina Springs, Arizona. He was well known in their community as a veteran of WWII, where he took part in the invasion of Normandy and earned a Purple Heart. Her mother Lydia Duran was the daughter of the Chief of Picuris Pueblo in Northern New Mexico and was a skilled potter. Connie was raised in Santa Fe, where her father taught woodworking and art at his alma mater, the Santa Fe Indian School.

As a teen, she toured the globe performing with Up with People, and took her high school courses via correspondence. She later went to Navajo Community College in Many Farms, Arizona and then to the Institute of American Indian Arts in Santa Fe.

=== Silversmith and jewelry artist ===
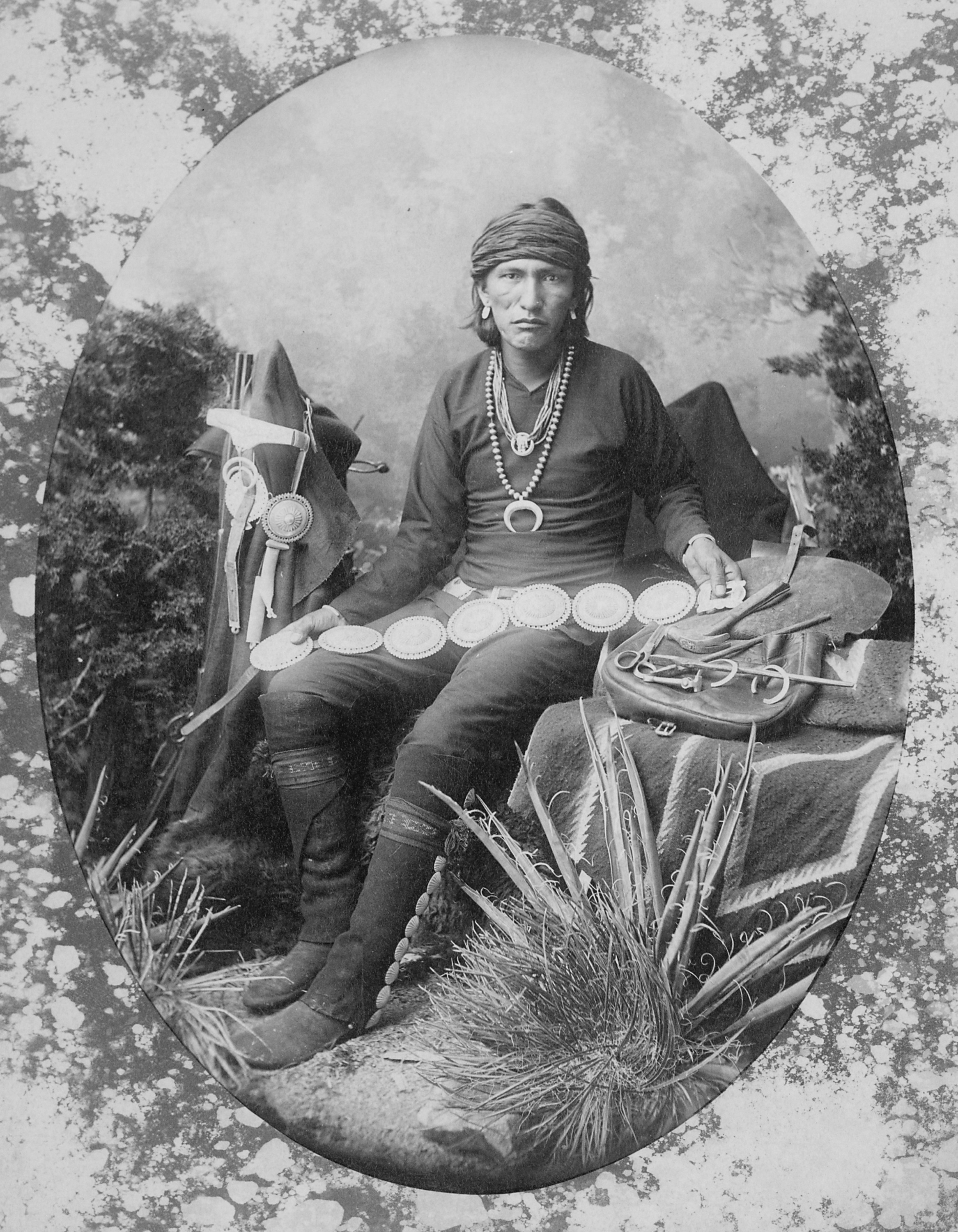
Navajo silversmithing was historically practiced by men. By taking up the art, Connie Tsosie Gaussoin became a pioneer for tribal women jewelry artists.

Tsosie Gaussoin first learned the art of silversmithing and jewelry making as a child from her father and uncle. She would assist them by gathering tufa for casting metalwork. She began selling her work at the Santa Fe Indian Market in 1969. Gaussoin became known for her tufa-cast silverwork, which was unusual for women to practice at the time.

As a jewelry artist, her work is informed by both Navajo and Pueblo tribal traditions combined with a modern and global aesthetic, with rich textures. She is inspired by Navajo weaving designs, as her aunts were rug weavers, but also takes inspiration from traditional Puebloan motifs.

Gaussoin also works as an educator, teaching her artistic techniques to others. She has taught art and jewelry design at the Eight Northern Indian Pueblo Council Vocation Program, the Poeh Arts Center, and the Wheelwright Museum in Santa Fe.

=== Awards ===
In 2005, Gaussoin was recognized with the City of Santa Fe's Mayor Award for Arts Education and later was recognized by The Santa Fe New Mexican as one of “10 Who Make a Difference.” In 2006, Gaussoin received the Rollin and Mary Ella King Native Artist Fellowship from The Indian Arts Research Center at the School for Advanced Research. In 2008, she was named a Living Treasure by the Museum of Indian Arts and Culture in Santa Fe.

=== Personal life and legacy ===
Connie Tsosie married Jerry Gaussoin, and together the couple has four children. Tsosie Gaussoin passed her knowledge and expertise in jewelry-making to her sons Jerry Jr., David, Wayne Nez, and daughter Tazbah Gaussoin, all of whom have become artists. Today, her descendants are prominent Native American jewelry and lapidary artists in their own right.
