= Sheridan WYO Rodeo =

Annual rodeo in Sheridan, Wyoming, United States

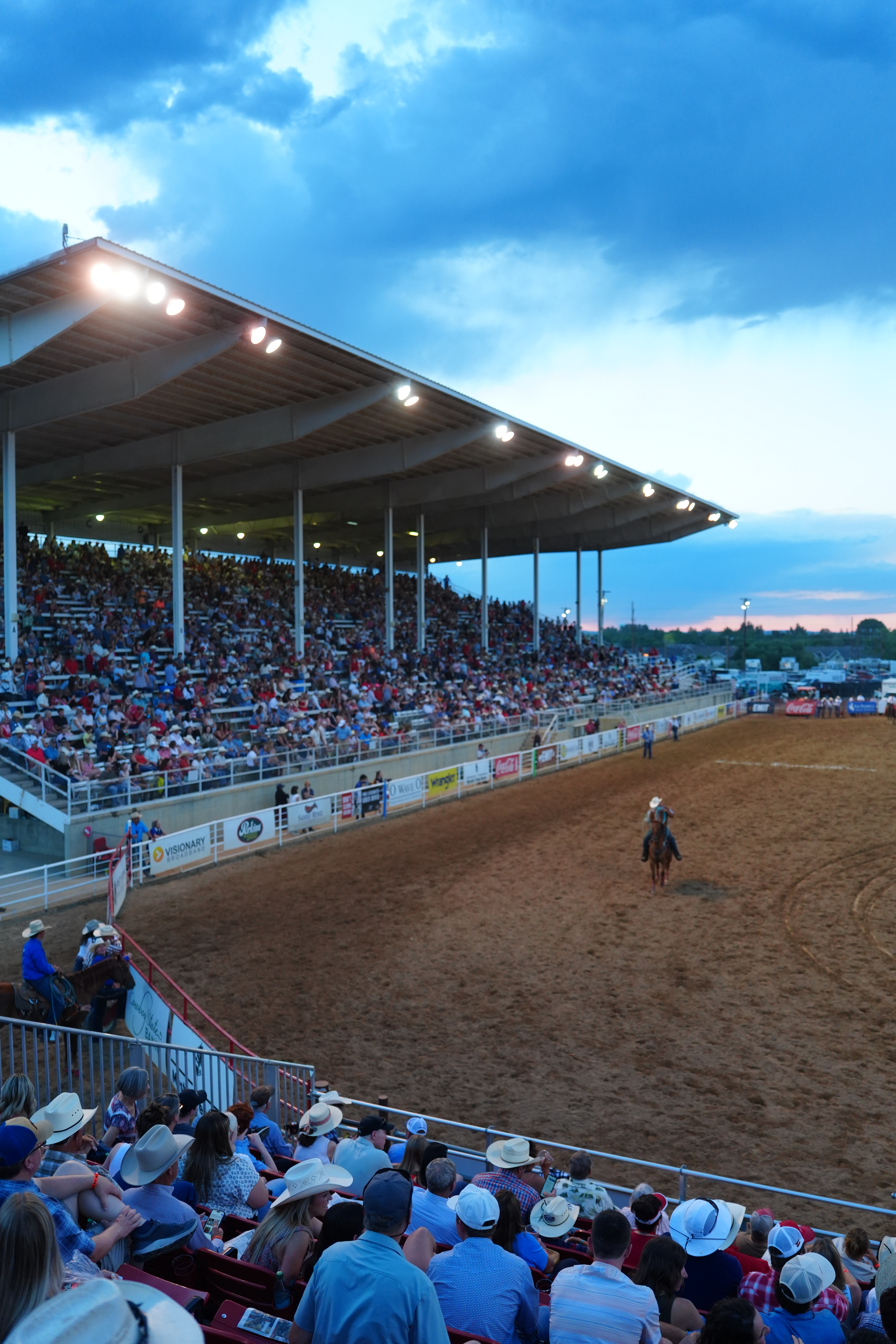
- Genre: Rodeo
- Frequency: Annually, in July
- Venue: Sheridan County Fairgrounds
- Locations: Sheridan, Wyoming, United States
- Country: United States
- Inaugurated: July 15, 1931
- Organiser: Sheridan WYO Rodeo, Inc.

The Sheridan WYO Rodeo is an annual rodeo sanctioned by the Professional Rodeo Cowboys Association (PRCA), held over four evening performances each July in Sheridan, Wyoming. Established in 1931, it is among the top 25 paying rodeos in the PRCA Playoff Series, with total payouts exceeding $300,000.

== History ==
A 1928 rodeo held at the P.K. Ranch west of Sheridan, which drew some 17,000 spectators from 28 states, served as a precursor to the event. Organizing for a permanent annual rodeo began in the Sheridan City Hall council chambers on January 28, 1931, with the inaugural rodeo held later that year. The name "Sheridan WYO Rodeo" was chosen from three proposals, which also included "Sheridan's Old West" and "Sheridan's Frontier Jamboree".

The rodeo was suspended during World War II beginning in 1942 because of supply and contestant shortages, although a smaller stampede event for local cowboys was held in 1944. The full rodeo resumed in 1951.

In 1951, Lucy Yellowmule, a sixteen-year-old Crow barrel racer from Wyola, Montana, was elected rodeo queen by audience applause, becoming the first Native American woman to hold the title. At the time, some Sheridan businesses openly refused service to Native Americans. After her selection, The Sheridan Press columnist Howard Sinclair arranged for Yellowmule and her court to appear before Sheridan civic groups, veterans' organizations, and private homes to discuss Crow culture and the damage caused by the discrimination. Restaurant owners subsequently removed anti-Indian signs from their businesses. The first All American Indian Days and Miss Indian America pageant, both prompted by Yellowmule's selection, were held alongside the rodeo in 1953. That year, the Freedoms Foundation at Valley Forge awarded the Sheridan community a George Washington Medal for "promoting better understanding between American Indian and White Races", with the medal presented during the rodeo.

== Events ==
The rodeo features standard PRCA and Women's Professional Rodeo Association events. The relay races, conceived by Crow rancher Shawn Real Bird, were added to the rodeo in the 1990s. Rodeo week activities in Sheridan include a Main Street parade, pancake breakfast, carnival, and concerts.
