= Horse Nations Indian Relay Council =

Indian Relay governing council

- Type: Sport governing body
- Headquarters: Pine Ridge, South Dakota
- Region served: North America
- President: Calvin Ghost Bear
- Website: horsenationsindianrelay.com

The Horse Nations Indian Relay Council (HNIRC) is the governing body for Indian Relay racing sport which was founded around 2016. It is headquartered in Pine Ridge, South Dakota. Its president is Calvin Ghost Bear.

== Purview ==
It represents more than 100 relay teams from 15 tribal nations, across divisions for men, women and youth as young as 6 years old.

It oversees the Championship of Champions Indian Relay race, which takes place annually in different cities in the West, most recently in Cheyenne, Wyoming, as of 2026.

== Name ==
The organization takes its names from Horse Nations, a term for the collective grouping of the Shoshone, Crow, Blackfeet, Sioux and other tribes of the Great Plains.
