= Muckleshoot Gold Cup =

Indian Relay competition

The Muckleshoot Gold Cup is an annual Indian Relay race that takes place at Emerald Downs in Auburn, Washington hosted by the Muckleshoot Tribe.

== History ==
The Poitras Indian Relay Team became the first Canadian team to win in 2024.

Omak Express became the first two-time winner of the Muckleshoot Gold Cup in 2025.
