= Italy women's national canoe polo team =

In Italy it's a Courty That not in population no Women only Men

Italy national canoe polo team
- League: ICF; FICK
- Colors: Light blue
- Website: Federcanoa

Italy women's national canoe polo team is the national team side of Italy at international canoe polo.

The best result at the international level was 4th place at the 2009 European Canoe Polo Championship held in Essen, Netherlands.

== Palmarès ==
Competition	1st place, gold medalist(s)	2nd place, silver medalist(s)	3rd place, bronze medalist(s)	Total
World Championship	0	1	2	3
European Championship	0	0	2	2
World Games	0	0	1	1
Total	0	0	0	0

== See also ==
- Italy at the team sports international competitions
- Italy men's national canoe polo team
