= Canoe England =

Previous body for paddlesports in England

In 2000 the British Canoe Union (BCU) federalised to become the umbrella organisation for the Home Nation Associations in Scotland (Scottish Canoe Association - SCA), Wales (Canoe Wales) and Northern Ireland (Canoe Association of Northern Ireland - CANI).

In England, Canoe England was set up similarly to the other National Associations, as a division of the BCU, to support the development of canoeing specifically in England.

In 2014 the British Canoe Union was renamed as British Canoeing.

In 2024 British Canoeing rebranded as Paddle UK.
