= Paddle Europe =

Canoeing governing body in Europe

- Membership: 45 member countries
- Founded: 1993; 33 years ago
- Affiliation: Paddle Worldwide
- Affiliation date: 1994
- Headquarters: Zagreb, Croatia
- President: Jean Zoungrana

Official website
- paddle-europe.eu

Paddle Europe, formerly known as the European Canoe Association (ECA), is the umbrella organization for canoeing sport in Europe. It was founded in Rome, Italy, on December 11, 1993. The organization has 45 member countries. The association was recognized by the International Canoe Federation at the ICF congress in Acapulco in 1994.

In response to the 2022 Russian invasion of Ukraine, the ECA suspended the participation of Russian and Belarusian athletes, and suspended all officials from Russia and Belarus from officiating at any ECA event and attending or taking part in any ECA meetings. In May 2023, the International Canoe Federation reinstated Russian and Belarusian athletes, shortly after a Russian missile attack forced cancellation of a canoe event in Ukraine.

== Disciplines ==
- Canoe sprint
- Canoe slalom
- Wildwater canoeing
- Canoe marathon
- Canoe Polo
- Canoe Sailing
- Dragon Boat
- Canoe freestyle
- Canoe ocean racing
- Paddleboarding and Standup paddleboarding

== Championships ==
- European Canoe Sprint Championships - annual event, established in 1933, discontinued in 1969, reinstated in 1997
- European Junior and U23 Canoe Sprint Championships - annual event, established in 1996
- European Canoe Slalom Championships - annual event, established in 1996
- European Junior and U23 Canoe Slalom Championships - annual event, established in 1995
- European Wildwater Championships - biennial event, established in 1997
- European Junior Wildwater Championships - biennial event
- European Canoe Marathon Championships - annual event, established in 1995
- European Canoe Ocean Racing Championships - biennial event
- European Canoe Polo Championship - biennial event, established in 1995
- European Canoe Freestyle Championships - biennial event
- European Dragon Boat Championships - biennial event

== Board of directors ==
- Jean Zoungrana, President (France)
- Moira Aston, Vice President (Ireland)
- Andrej Jelenc, Vice President (Slovenia)

== Members ==
- Albania
- Andorra
- Armenia - ANRCF
- Austria
- Belarus
- Belgium
- Bosnia and Herzegovina
- Bulgaria
- Croatia - HKS
- Cyprus
- Czech Republic
- Denmark
- Estonia - EA
- Finland
- France
- Great Britain - Paddle UK
- Georgia
- Germany
- Greece
- Hungary - MKSSZ
- Ireland - ICU
- Israel - ICA
- Italy
- Latvia
- Lithuania
- Luxembourg
- Macedonia
- Malta
- Moldova
- Montenegro
- Netherlands
- Norway
- Poland
- Portugal - FPC
- Romania
- Russia
- Serbia
- Slovakia
- Slovenia
- Spain
- Sweden
- Switzerland
- Turkey
- Ukraine
