= Italy men's national canoe polo team =

Italy national canoe polo team
- League: ICF; FICK
- Colors: Light blue
- Website: Federcanoa

Italy men's national canoe polo team is the national team side of Italy at international canoe polo.

== Palmarès ==
Competition	1st place, gold medalist(s)	2nd place, silver medalist(s)	3rd place, bronze medalist(s)	Total
World Championship	2	3	4	9
European Championship	1	3	6	10
World Games	0	2	1	3
Total	3	8	11	22

== See also ==
- Italy at the team sports international competitions
- Italy women's national canoe polo team
