= Afon Tryweryn =

River in north Wales

Coordinates: 52°55′N 3°35′W

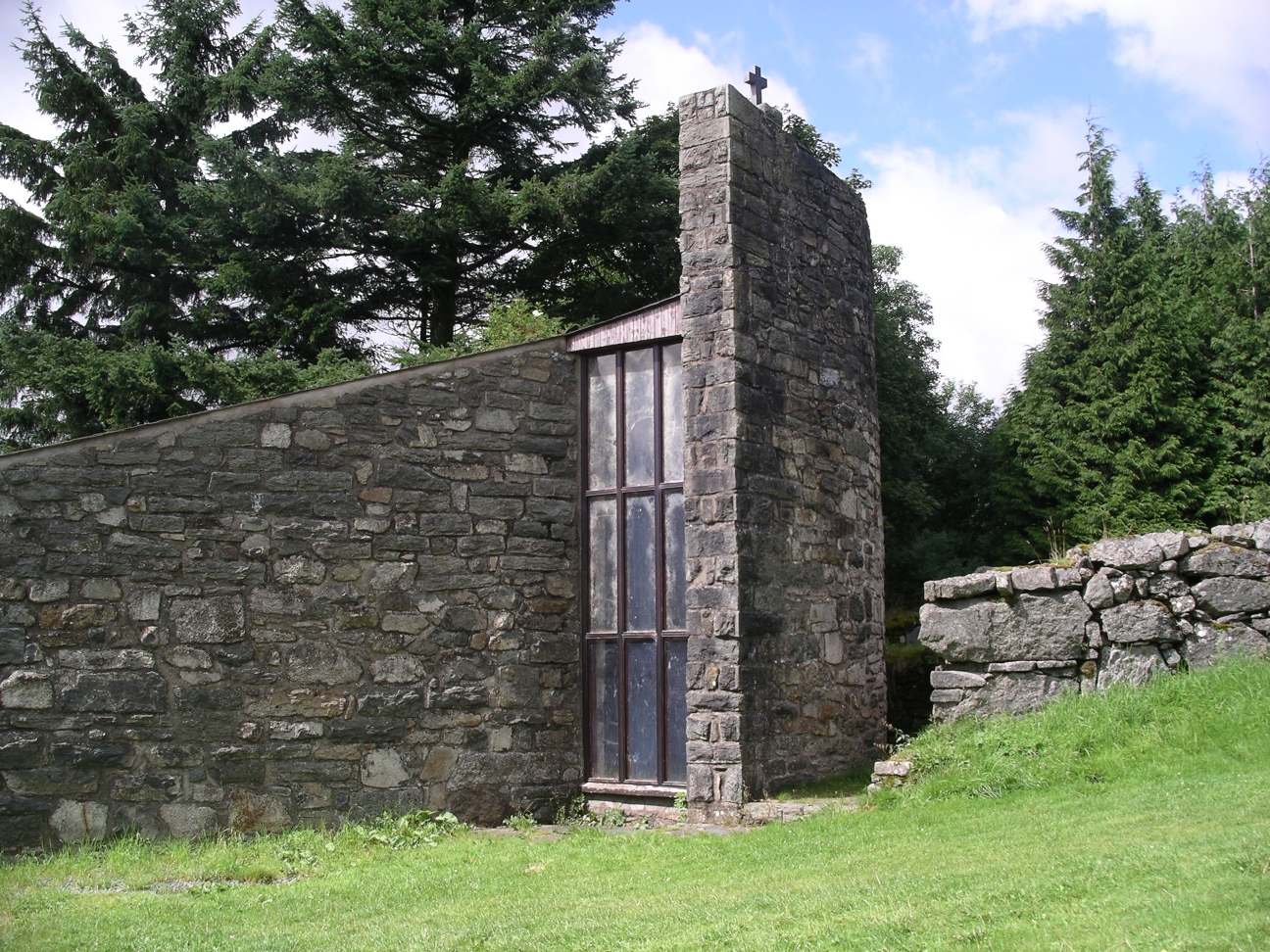
- Memorial chapel to the flooded village of Capel Celyn

- Location of mouth

Location
- Country: Wales

Physical characteristics
- Source: Llyn Tryweryn
- Mouth
  - location: Confluence with Dee
- Length: 19 km (12 mi)

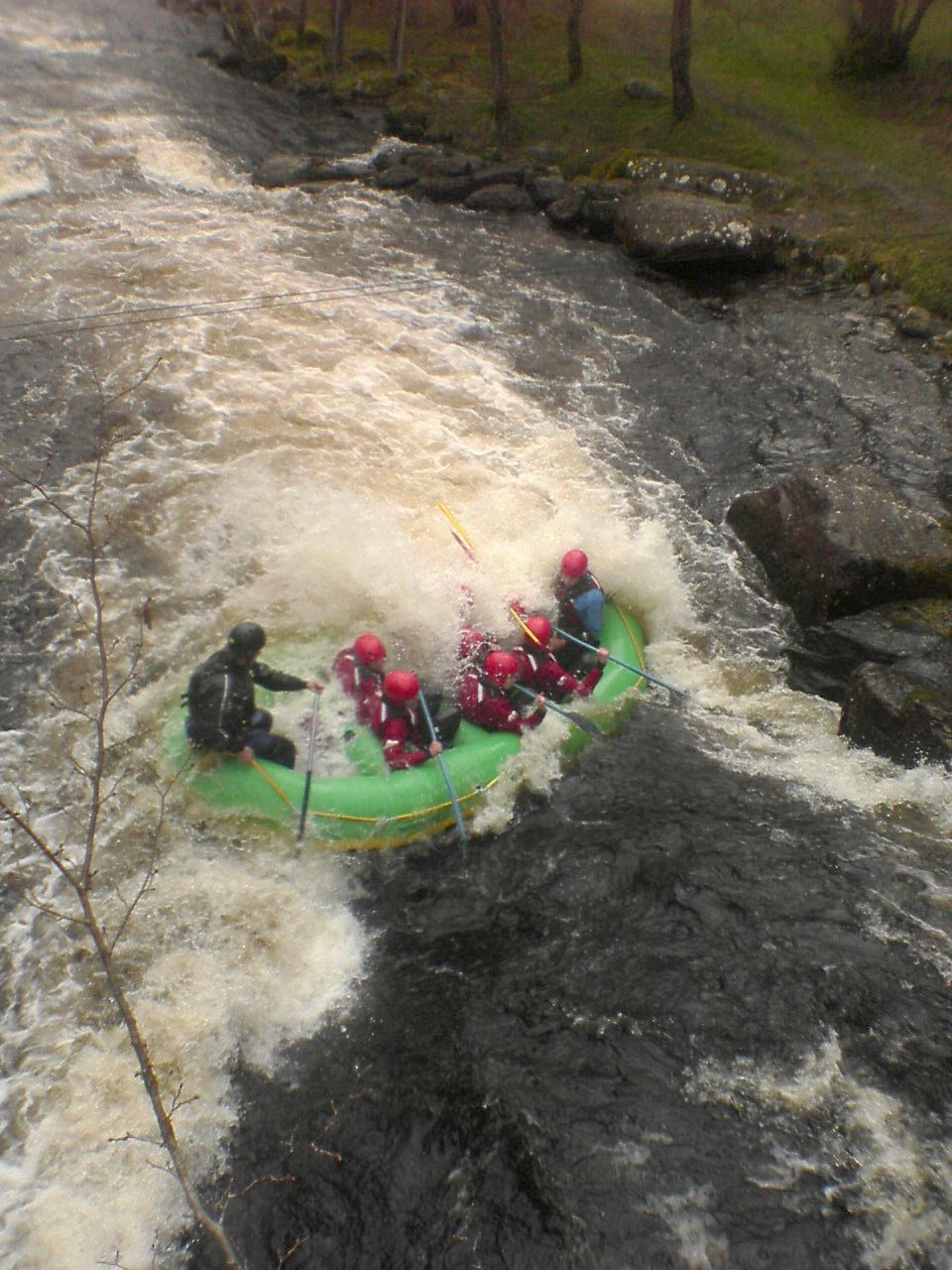
Afon Tryweryn rafters hitting the standing wave of a hydraulic jump.

Afon Tryweryn is a river in the north of Wales which starts at Llyn Tryweryn in the Snowdonia National Park and after 19 kilometres (12 mi) joins the river Dee at Bala. One of the main tributaries of the Dee, it was dammed in 1965 to form Llyn Celyn. The Tryweryn flooding forcibly removed residents of the village of Capel Celyn despite popular and political opposition in Wales. The resulting graffiti "Cofiwch Dryweryn" ('remember Tryweryn') near Llanrhystud became an icon of Welsh feeling. Water is stored in Llyn Celyn in winter when flows are high, and released over the summer to maintain the flow in the Dee (water from the Dee is used as the water supply for large areas of north-east Wales, and for the Wirral and much of Liverpool in England).

== Whitewater sports ==
Afon Tryweryn joins the River Dee roughly half a mile downstream from Llyn Tegid (Bala Lake). The reservoir now at the head of Afon Tryweryn was created in 1965, to provide water to Liverpool. At that time, the 67 inhabitants of the village of Capel Celyn were forcibly removed.

Afon Tryweryn is the site of the Welsh Canolfan Tryweryn national whitewater centre, managed by the Welsh Canoe Association. It is an important river for whitewater kayaking and rafting. The centre features a café and facilities to support whitewater sports. The natural whitewater rapids of the upper section of Afon Tryweryn have been modified (by placing boulders along the river bed) to make them safer and to build playspots. The upper part of the river is usually considered to be Grade III. Usually between 9 and 12 m^{3}/s are released from the Llyn Celyn Dam. The rapids of the lower section remain in a more natural state. These are of somewhat easier grade, with the exception of Bala Mill Falls.

The regular releases from Llyn Celyn in summer mean that kayak events and trips can be planned in advance, and commercial rafting can take place. Most whitewater rivers in Wales rely on recent rain to have enough water for kayaking or rafting.

Access to the upper part of Afon Tryweryn is uncontroversial - this contrasts with recreational access to many of the other rivers in Wales (see Rivers Access Campaign for more information), and adds to the popularity of Afon Tryweryn among kayakers and rafters.

In August 2004, John Prescott, deputy prime minister, was on a rafting trip on Afon Tryweryn and helped to aid a kayaker who had been injured.
