= Canolfan Tryweryn =

White water sports venue near Bala, Wales

Coordinates: 52.947°N 3.651°W

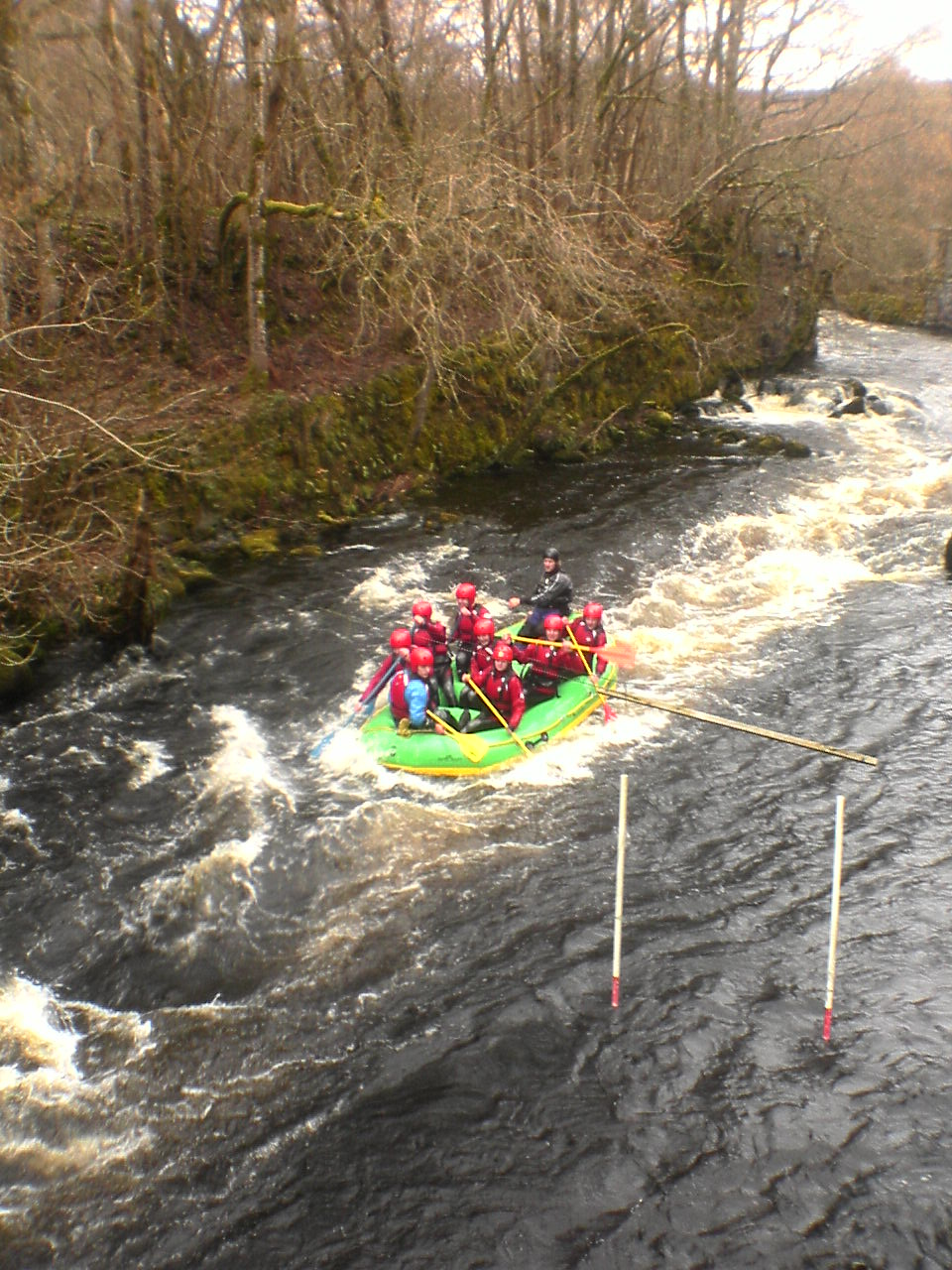
Approach to Stone Bridge

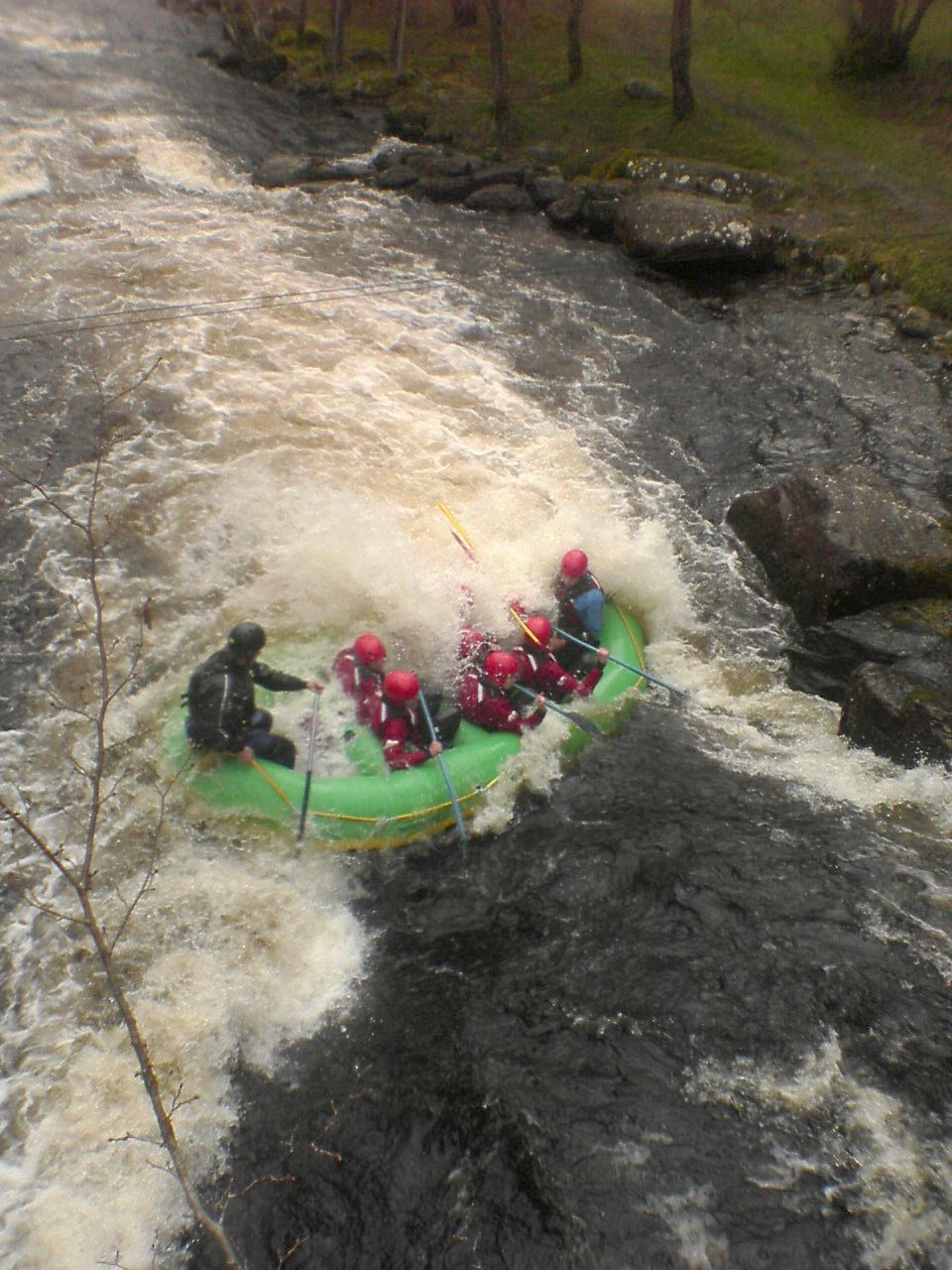
Stone Bridge a.k.a. Miss Davis

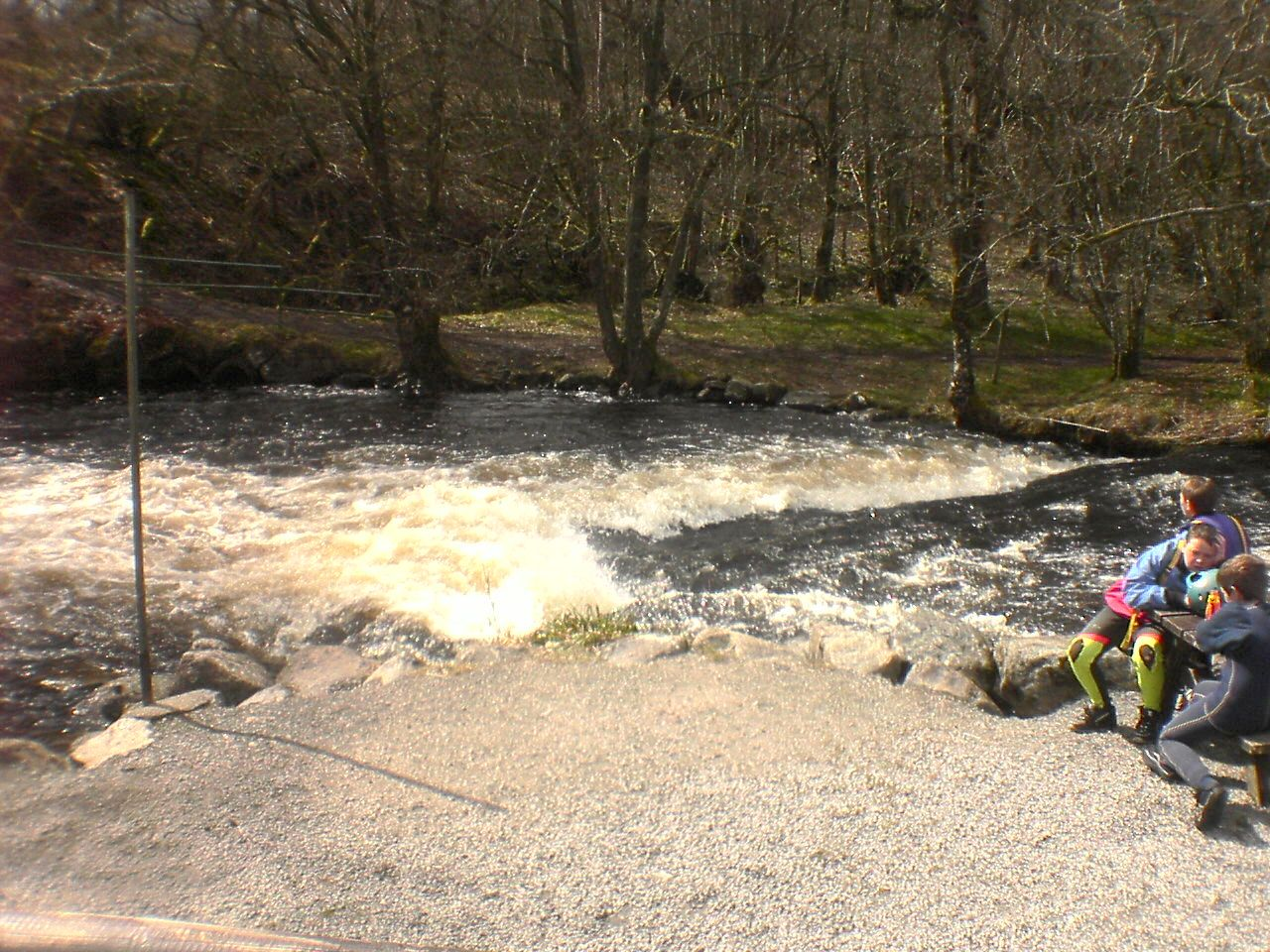
Café Wave

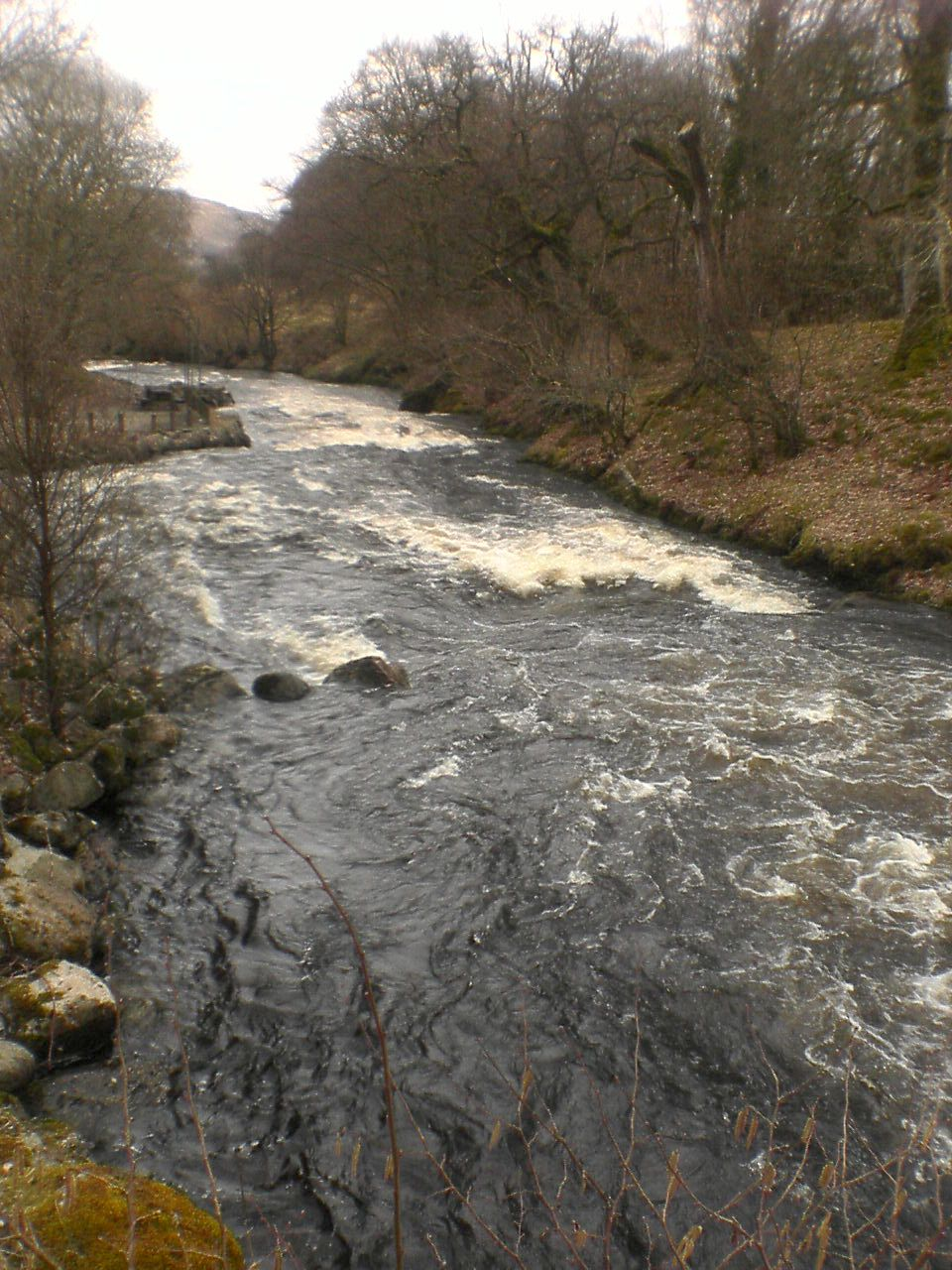
Fingers

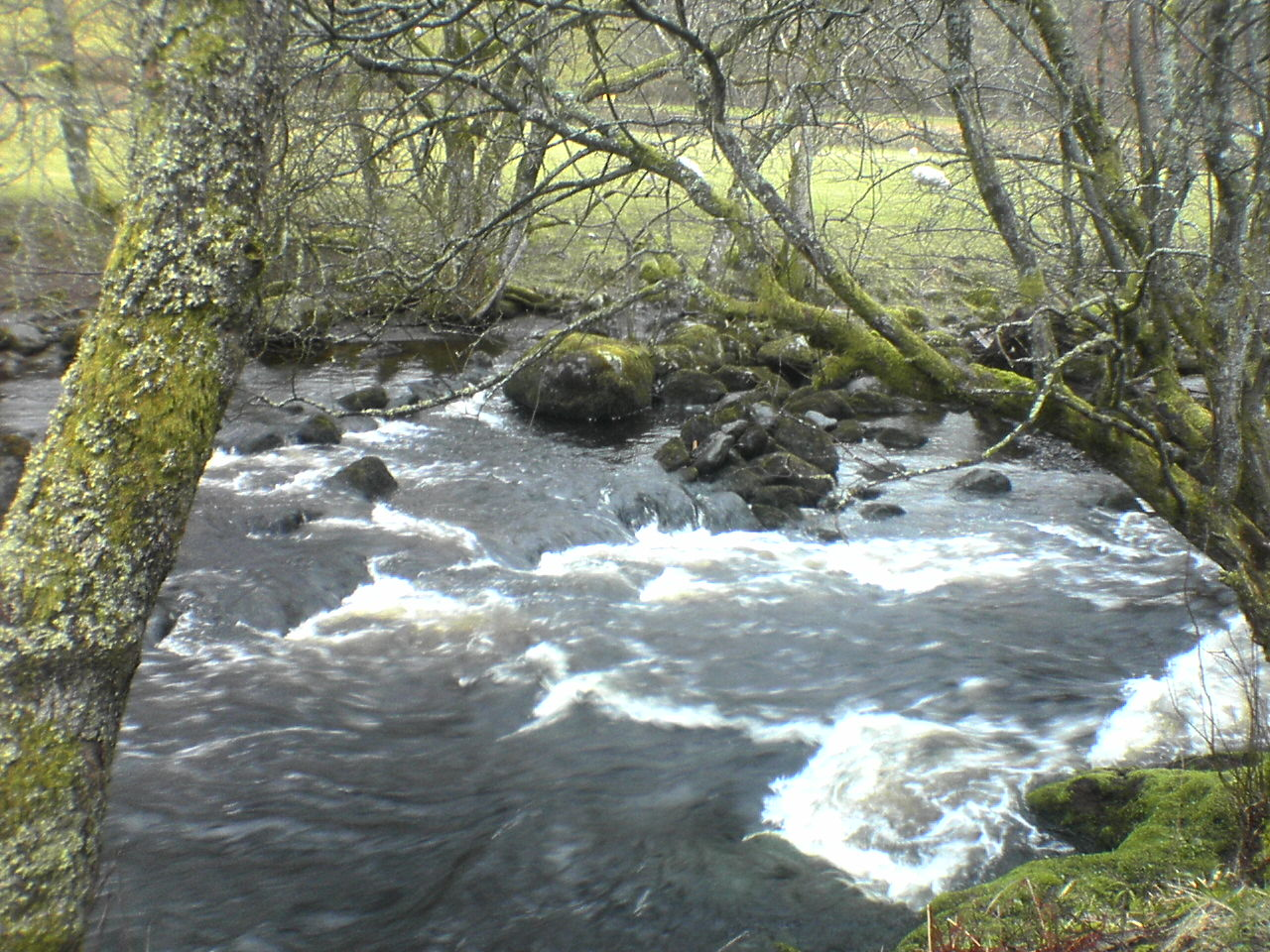
Beside Tyn Cornel Campsite

Canolfan Tryweryn is the National White Water Centre for Wales, and is based near Bala in north Wales. In 1986, it developed the first commercial white water rafting operation in the UK. The centre is home to paddlesport National Governing Body Canoe Wales.

== The River Tryweryn ==
The Tryweryn is a river in north Wales. It flows from Llyn Celyn in the Snowdonia National Park and after 19 km (12 mi) joins the river Dee at Bala. It is one of the main tributaries of the Dee and has been dammed to form Llyn Celyn. Water is stored in winter when flows are high, and released over the summer to maintain the flow in the Dee, meaning that the river often has suitable water levels for kayakers and rafters at time of year when natural rivers throughout Wales may be too low. The dam usually releases between 9 and 12 m^{3}/s (2,000 and 2,600 imperial gallons per second).

The whitewater rapids have been modified by placing boulders in strategic points along the course of the river to create eddys, drops and play spots.

Access to the centre requires payment for both commercial and non-commercial users.

The river is generally split into three sections: Top Site, Centre Section and the Lower Tryweryn.

=== The Top Site ===
The Top Site (often called the Upper Upper Tryweryn) is the section of river leading from the stilling basin below the Llyn Celyn dam down to where the fish trap was located. The fish-trap – known as the chipper because it resembles a chip-slicer – was removed in November 2019. This section is a nice Grade II to Grade III, with a good play-hole (the "Top-Hole") and a playful weir. The section is often used for safety and rescue courses, as well as kayaking freestyle competitions. Officially there is no raft or canoe access to this top section.

=== The Centre Section ===
This section (commonly known as the Upper Tryweryn) is the main part of the Tryweryn, it runs for approximately 1.25 miles (2.0 km) from the site of the chipper down to the Tyn Cornel camping site, and is a good Grade III. It contains most of the main white-water features of the river:

- Graveyard
- Ski Jump
- Fedwr Gog Falls (a.k.a. Miss Davis' Bridge, or 'Stone' bridge),
- Café Wave
- Fingers
- NRA (National Rivers Authority) Bridge
- Chapel Falls

=== The Lower Tryweryn ===
Running the 2.5 miles (4.0 km) from the Tyn Cornel campsite down to Bala, this is a Grade II bordering on Grade III section which finishes at Bala Mill Falls (an easily portaged Grade IV rapid). This section is not managed like the upper Tryweryn, although the centre has been known to remove fallen trees and other obstructions/hazards quickly.

== See also ==
- Afon Tryweryn
- Cardiff International White Water
- Canoe Wales
- British Canoeing
- Welsh Canoeing Association
- International Scale of River Difficulty
