= Manchester Canoe Club =

Water sports club in Greater Manchester, England

- Sport: Canoeing; Kayaking; Canoe Slalom; Canoe Polo
- Founded: 1933
- Affiliation: British Canoe Union
- Affiliation date: 1936
- Regional affiliation: North West England

Official website
- www.manchestercanoeclub.org
- (United Kingdom)

The Manchester Canoe Club (MCC) is based on the banks of the River Goyt at Marple, in Greater Manchester, England. Since its foundation in 1933, the club has been actively involved in the development of canoe sport, particularly in the competitive discipline of Canoe Slalom. It also has an active whitewater section.

== History ==
=== Foundation ===
Manchester Canoe Club was formed at an inaugural meeting in May 1933 following the publication of a letter by Hans Renold to the Times Newspaper to contact people interested in paddling on White Water. It became part of the British Canoe Association, making it one of the oldest canoe clubs in the United Kingdom. MCC founded the British Canoe Union in 1936, along with Clyde Canoe Club, the Royal Canoe Club, and the Canoe section of the Camping Club. In the early years, Manchester Canoe Club was primarily focused on touring and canoe camping. When canoe slalom gained popularity in 1939, MCC became a pioneering club in the sport. During the WW2 years the Club was kept "afloat' by Maurice Rothwell who acted as secretary and with others celebrated the end of the war by paddling on the River Spey. It was his records of Club Tours that helped to confirm access to the River Spey in a later court case.

The Club took part in all aspects of White Water Paddling – Slalom, River Racing and Touring. On one of their trips to the French Alps they came across a French Rivers Competition that was run on Several Rivers and in Age Groups. They found they had members to compete in all the groups and won many of the competitions. The trophies they received were brought home and formed the basis of a Club Competition they called the Quinzaine Series.

Maurice Rothwell had become prominent in the Canoe Slalom hierarchy. As one of the few car owning people at that time he would assist the British Team when travelling abroad, and in his Official capacity officiated at the first Televised Slalom event which was in Doncaster.

During the 60s and 70s the Club became very much involved in Canoe Slalom and ran many events each year for the BCU's Slalom Calendar, not just on their home water in Marple but also as far afield as Easby Abbey in Yorkshire, Langollen in Wales, (this event was known as the Serpent's Tail), and the Tryweryn also in Wales. In 1981 the Tryweryn was the site of the first World Canoe Championships held in Britain and the Club's expertise was called on to provide the Results Service for the Slalom event. Over 40 members took part in receiving, checking and recording the competitors results which were then displayed on the main and also 2 remote score boards. It was said that this was the first time at a World Slalom Event that the competitors could see their provisional results as soon as they got off the water. Members attending Nottingham University were, amongst others, instrumental in arranging for Nottingham Council Officials to attend the event which was to pave the way for the first Artificial Slalom Site at Holme Pierrepoint.

In the late 60s, the club began searching for a permanent club site, and found the current site at Dale Road, Marple. Initially, MCC could only lease the site for a year at a time, so plans for a permanent club headquarters had to be abandoned; instead, a caravan was brought onto the site and used. In 1974, as a long-term lease agreement looked more possible, the caravan was replaced with a World War II nissen hut. After years of searching, MCC negotiated a 7-year lease of the club site in 1988. In 1992, MCC was able to purchase the site permanently; to do this, the club received a grant from the Foundation for Sports and Arts. Plans for a new clubhouse were started however changes to the funding system meant further plans were stalled and leadership from Dave Higson eventually got things moving again and funding from Sports England was approved in February 2002, this together with a considerable bequest from Maurice Rothwell together with the Club's own Building Fund allowed for the construction of the new clubhouse which began shortly afterwards, and finished in August 2003. In 2017 the club used its own funds combined with funds from Sport England to build a new boathouse replacing the shipping containers that had long been used to house the club's equipment.

=== Present ===
MCC has club officers who are responsible for the training, promotion, and co-ordination of each section (Slalom and Whitewater). MCC host several national slalom races for divisions 3 and 4 during the Canoe Slalom season. Training courses are also held at the local Hazel Grove baths during winter. MCC takes an active role in campaigns and political debates. In January 2008, Mark Davies (club chairman) appeared on the BBC Politics North West show, campaigning for river access.

== River Goyt ==
The River Goyt runs from the Errwood, Fernilee, and Etherow reservoirs, which tends to stabilise the river level. The stretch of the River Goyt at the club site is fairly placid (grade 2). but can become grade 3 and higher in heavy rain. The stretch has rapids either side, and contains a number of pools and eddies; the water is also very clean, shown by the rise in fishing.

In Summer 2008, extensive work was carried out at the club site to alter the river flow, creating new river features and obstacles.
