= Canoe polo at the 2005 World Games =

Canoe polo at the 2005 World Games.

== Medalists ==
Event	Gold	Silver	Bronze
Men	Netherlands (NED)	Germany (GER)	Great Britain (GBR)
Women	Germany (GER)	Great Britain (GBR)	Japan (JPN)

== See also ==
- Canoe polo at the World Games
