= Canoe polo at the 2017 World Games =

- No. of events: 2

Canoe polo at the 2017 World Games.

== Medalists ==
Event	Gold	Silver	Bronze
Men's	Germany; Johan Driessen; Jakob Husen; Fiete Maik Junge; Robert Pest; Lukas Richter; Lennart Unterfeld; Jonas Vieren; Dennis Witt	Italy; Luca Bellini; Andrea Bertelloni; Edoarda Corvaia; Gianluca Distefano; Gianmarco Emanuele; Jan Erik Haack; Marco Porzio; Andrea Romano	Spain; Alejandro Casal Dasilva; Vicente Claramonte Ballester; Sergio Corbella Trillo; Victor Gonzalez Azpiazu; Angel Gordo Herrero; Alejandro Gordo Herrero; Adrian Hermida; Alejandro Valls Valls
Women's	Germany; Elena Gilles; Katharina Magdalena Kruse; Tonie Maxime Lenz; Svenja Schaeper; Pia Schwarz; Caroline Esther Sinsel; Fabienne Thole; Leonie Wagner	France; Annie Chevalier; Melissa Ledormeur; Claire Moal; Rose-Marie Pierre; Aline Roulland; Julie Roux; Valerie Sibioude; Nais Zanfini	Italy; Martina Anastasi; Roberta Catania; Silvia Cogoni; Maddalena Lago; Flavia Landolina; Ada Prestipino; Maria Anna Szczepanska; Chiara Trevisan

== See also ==
- Canoe polo at the World Games
