= Liffey Descent Canoe Race =

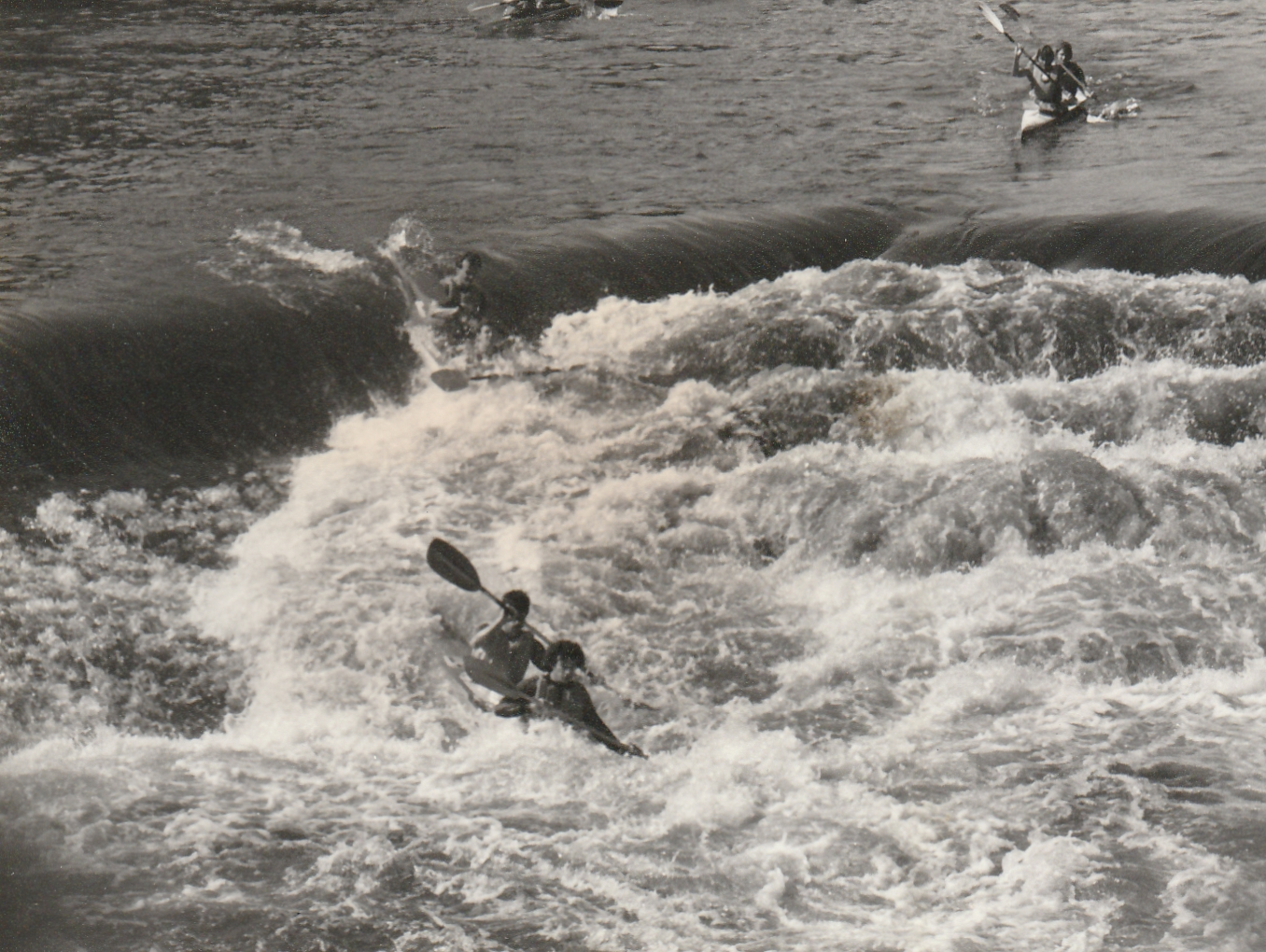
Competitors descending Straffan weir during the 1980 race

The Liffey Descent Canoe Race is an annual down river canoe and kayak race, of some 18 miles in length, that has been held on the River Liffey in Dublin, Ireland since 1960. It starts by the K Club above Straffan weir in County Kildare, and historically finished by the Dublin University Boat Club adjacent to the Irish National War Memorial Gardens at Islandbridge in Dublin city centre. It is organised by the Irish Canoe Union and is normally timed to coincide with The Liffey Swim. 2009 saw the 50th anniversary of the event.

In 2012, the event was added to the Classic Marathon Series of the International Canoe Federation. The race is aided by volunteer rescue divers from the Irish Underwater Council (principally from Aquatec Sub Aqua Club) who swim into the turbulent waters below several of the tougher weirs on the route to rescue struggling or overturned canoeists.

== History ==
In the late 1950s, the first canoe clubs in Ireland began, in Dublin, Kilcullen and Belfast, made possible by the advent of soft-skinned kayaks (which arrived in kit form). Eventually more durable hulls made of plywood, fibreglass and glass-fibre replaced these and made the navigation of weirs a possibility.

Busáras, the central bus station in Dublin (opened in 1953), hosted the first 'Irish Boat Show' during Easter week, 18–23 April 1960. Although the show's main focus was sailing, it featured other water sports such as diving, water skiing and canoeing. Coca-Cola presented a cup for the winner of a canoe race held on 23 April, which ran between Grattan and Butt Bridge in the city centre, and was won by Roger Greene. This sprint, of a mere 800m metres, became the forerunner to the much longer marathon canoe race of the Liffey Descent, which has been held annually on the river ever since.

A year later, in 1961, Roger Greene and Ernest Lawrence offered to arrange a more adventurous two-day Liffey race in the month of September. This race would start at Straffan and finish at the Garda boat club in Islandbridge, with an overnight camp immediately below the New Bridge on Leixlip Lake. Newspapers such as the Irish Times assisted in advertising the event:

"Only those who wear life jackets and are able to swim will be eligible, as the small craft (value £10-£50 pounds each) must negotiate 11 weirs on the 20 miles from Straffan, four miles south west of Celbridge, Co Kildare, to Islandbridge. Eight handicaps will be decided and three of these are for lady competitors only. The fixture has been arranged by the Dún Laoghaire Canoe Club"

According to post-race reports, the first day had finished in rain "when camp was made before the paddlers retired to the Celbridge hostelries while the girls who had come along to cook went home for the night". Greene won the race again, with a cumulative time of 3 hours 28 minutes.

At a meeting in the Cliff Castle Hotel, Dalkey, in November 1961, the Irish Canoe Union was formed. The organisation was set up with a cross-border ethos, and at the inaugural meeting, 33 delegates attended, representing canoe clubs from Dún Laoghaire, Kilcullen, Trinity College Dublin, Clongowes Wood College, Stranmillis Training College (now Stranmillis University College) (Belfast), Stewart's (Belfast), Park Parade School (Belfast), and the general Belfast canoe club.

The 1962 race was the first held under the auspices of the nascent Irish Canoe Union. The national press failed to report on the event, no times are recorded for competitors completing the race, and (as of 2019) "none of the paddlers involved [had] a clear memory of the event".

Between 1963 and 1969, the event grew from a local race held in soft-skin boats on low water, to a full international event on a flooded river (courtesy of the ESB who controlled waterflow at dams along the river) in state-of-the-art boats. The race was still not known as the Liffey Descent at this stage, and the words Irish International Canoe Racing Long Distance Championship were engraved on trophies awarded in 1964 and 1965. The inspiration to name the race The Liffey Descent is thought to derive from the Descenso del Sella race along the River Sella in northern Spain, at which Irish competitors competed in 1964.

In 1965 came the first truly "International Liffey Descent" with the race set on a par with the other national marathon races, such as the aforementioned Descenso del Sella, and the British Open, held in Bradford-on-Avon that year. Since the 1967 race, divers have been present at each event to assist participants who get into difficulty.

=== Modern era ===
In August 2022, the race (set to take place the month after) was cancelled due to "extremely low levels" of water in the reservoir that supplies the river. The alternative option to host the race in April was proposed, to alleviate "the annual issue with water levels, which have become more problematic in recent years".

== Sponsorship ==
As of 2023, the two major sponsorships of the race thus far have been the Dublin Bottlers of Coca-Cola (1960-1971) and Irish Distillers, through its Jameson whiskey brand (1988-2003).

== Sources ==
- Maclean, Iain (2019). The Liffey Descent: 60 Years of Ireland's Toughest Canoe Challenge. Dublin: Maclean Publications. ISBN 978-1527245693.
