= Portuguese Canoe Federation =

National governing body for canoeing and kayaking in Portugal

- Sport: Canoeing
- Founded: 10 May 1979
- Affiliation: International Canoe Federation
- Regional affiliation: European Canoe Association
- President: Victor Felix

Official website
- www.fpcanoagem.pt
- (Portugal)

The Portuguese Canoe Federation (Portuguese: Federação Portuguesa de Canoagem) is the governing body of canoeing in Portugal. It organizes the Portuguese representation at international competitions and the Portuguese National Championships of Canoe sprint, Canoe slalom, Wildwater canoeing, Canoe marathon, Canoe Polo and Canoe freestyle.

The Federation was formed on 10 May 1979 in Portugal. It became a member of the International Canoe Federation and of the European Canoe Association in 1980.

== List of medalists at the canoe sprint main international competitions ==
=== European Games ===
Fernando Pimenta is the only portuguese canoeist who won medals at the first edition of the European Games in 2015.

| Rank | Athlete | Event(s) | From | To | Gold | Silver | Bronze | Total |
|---|---|---|---|---|---|---|---|---|
| 1 | Fernando Pimenta | K1 1000 m, K1 5000 m | 2015 | 2015 | 0 | 2 | 0 | 2 |

=== European Championships ===
A total of 9 canoeists won 27 medals for Portugal at the Canoe Sprint European Championships. Fernando Pimenta is the best portuguese canoeist with 16 medals, 11 in individual events, more than half of the medals won by Portugal.

| Rank | Athlete | Event(s) | From | To | Gold | Silver | Bronze | Total |
|---|---|---|---|---|---|---|---|---|
| 1 | Fernando Pimenta | K1 500 m, K1 1000 m, K1 5000 m, K2 500 m, K4 1000 m | 2010 | 2018 | 5 | 5 | 6 | 16 |
| 2 | Emanuel Silva | K1 1000 m, K2 500 m, K4 1000 m | 2005 | 2015 | 2 | 2 | 4 | 8 |
| 3 | João Ribeiro | K2 500 m, K4 1000 m | 2011 | 2015 | 2 | 2 | 2 | 6 |
| 4 | Teresa Portela | K1 200 m, K1 500 m, K2 200 m | 2011 | 2018 | 1 | 0 | 4 | 5 |
| 5 | David Fernandes | K4 1000 m | 2011 | 2015 | 1 | 2 | 1 | 4 |
| 6 | Joana Vasconcelos | K2 200 m | 2012 | 2018 | 1 | 1 | 1 | 3 |
| 7 | Francisca Laia | K2 200 m | 2017 | 2017 | 0 | 1 | 0 | 1 |
| 8 | Beatriz Gomes | K2 200 m | 2012 | 2012 | 0 | 0 | 1 | 1 |
| 9 | Hélder Silva | C1 200 m | 2014 | 2014 | 0 | 0 | 1 | 1 |
