= ICF Canoe Polo World Championships =

Biennial international canoe polo tournaments

ICF Men's & Women's Canoe Polo World Championships
- Sport: Canoe polo
- Founded: 1994; 32 years ago
- Founder: International Canoe Federation
- Most recent champions: Italy (men; 2nd title); Germany (women; 8th title)
- Most titles: France (men; 4 titles each); Germany (women; 8 titles)

The ICF Canoe Polo World Championships are international competitions in the sport of canoe polo. They have taken place every two years since 1994 (U21 since 2002), in a different venue each time. Medals are awarded by national team; the German team has won the most medals in total.

== Results ==
=== Men ===
Year	Host	Gold	Silver	Bronze
1987; Details	Savoie, France	France	United Kingdom	Netherlands
1994; Details	Sheffield, United Kingdom	Australia	Germany	United Kingdom
1996; Details	Adelaide, Australia	Australia	Italy	Germany
1998; Details	Aveiro, Portugal	Australia	United Kingdom	Italy
2000; Details	São Paulo, Brazil	United Kingdom	Netherlands	Germany
2002; Details	Essen, Germany	United Kingdom	Netherlands	Germany
2004; Details	Miyoshi, Japan	Netherlands	Germany	United Kingdom
2006; Details	Amsterdam, Netherlands	France	Italy	Netherlands
2008; Details	Edmonton, Canada	Netherlands	France	Italy
2010; Details	Milan, Italy	France	Germany	Italy
2012; Details	Poznań, Poland	Netherlands	Germany	France
2014; Details	Thury-Harcourt, France	France	Germany	Spain
2016; Details	Syracuse, Italy	Italy	France	Spain
2018; Details	Welland, Canada	Germany	Italy	Spain
2020	Rome, Italy	Cancelled due to COVID-19 pandemic in Italy.
2022; Details	Saint-Omer, France	Germany	Spain	Italy
2024; Details	Deqing, China	Germany	France	Denmark
2026; Details	Duisburg, Germany	Italy	Germany	France

=== Women ===
Year	Host	Gold	Silver	Bronze
1994; Details	Sheffield, United Kingdom	Australia	United Kingdom	France
1996; Details	Adelaide, Australia	United Kingdom	Australia	Germany
1998; Details	Aveiro, Portugal	Australia	United Kingdom	France
2000; Details	São Paulo, Brazil	Germany	United Kingdom	France
2002; Details	Essen, Germany	Germany	France	Australia
2004; Details	Miyoshi, Japan	United Kingdom	Germany	France
2006; Details	Amsterdam, Netherlands	Germany	New Zealand	Netherlands
2008; Details	Edmonton, Canada	United Kingdom	Germany	France
2010; Details	Milan, Italy	(United Kingdom); Great Britain	Germany	France
2012; Details	Poznań; Poland	Germany	(United Kingdom); Great Britain	Australia
2014; Details	Thury-Harcourt, France	Germany	(United Kingdom); Great Britain	France
2016; Details	Syracuse, Italy	New Zealand	Germany	France
2018; Details	Welland, Canada	Germany	(United Kingdom); Great Britain	Italy
2020	Rome, Italy	Cancelled due to COVID-19 pandemic in Italy.
2022; Details	Saint-Omer, France	Germany	France	Italy
2024; Details	Deqing, China	New Zealand	Italy	Netherlands
2026; Details	Duisburg, Germany	Germany	France	(United Kingdom); Great Britain

=== Men Under-21 ===
Year	Host	Gold	Silver	Bronze
2002	Essen, Germany	Germany	Netherlands	Italy
2004	Miyoshi, Japan	Spain	Italy	Japan
2006	Amsterdam, Netherlands	France	Netherlands	Spain
2008	Edmonton, Canada	(United Kingdom); Great Britain	France	Italy
2010	Milan, Italy	Germany	France	(United Kingdom); Great Britain
2012; Details	Poznań, Poland	France	(United Kingdom); Great Britain	Germany
2014; Details	Thury-Harcourt, France	France	Denmark	Germany
2016; Details	Syracuse, Italy	(United Kingdom); Great Britain	Germany	Italy
2018; Details	Welland, Canada	(United Kingdom); Great Britain	Germany	Italy
2020	Rome, Italy	Cancelled due to COVID-19 pandemic in Italy.
2022; Details	Saint-Omer, France	Spain	Germany	Italy
2024; Details	Deqing, China	Spain	Germany	Italy
2026; Details	Duisburg, Germany	France	New Zealand	Germany

=== Women Under-21 ===
Year	Host	Gold	Silver	Bronze
2002	Essen, Germany	Germany	Poland	Japan
2010	Milan, Italy	France	Germany	(United Kingdom); Great Britain
2012; Details	Poznań, Poland	Germany	France	New Zealand
2014; Details	Thury-Harcourt, France	Germany	France	New Zealand
2016; Details	Syracuse, Italy	Germany	Poland	New Zealand
2018; Details	Welland, Canada	Germany	Poland	New Zealand
2020	Rome, Italy	Cancelled due to COVID-19 pandemic in Italy.
2022; Details	Saint-Omer, France	New Zealand	Germany	Spain
2024; Details	Deqing, China	France	Spain	New Zealand
2026; Details	Duisburg, Germany	Spain	New Zealand	Germany

== Medals ==
=== Men (1987-2026) ===
Rank	Nation	Gold	Silver	Bronze	Total
1	France	4	3	2	9
2	Germany	3	6	3	12
3	Netherlands	3	2	2	7
4	Australia	3	0	0	3
5	Italy	2	3	4	9
6	Great Britain	2	2	2	6
7	Spain	0	1	3	4
8	Denmark	0	0	1	1
Totals (8 entries)		17	17	17	51

=== Women (1994-2026) ===
Rank	Nation	Gold	Silver	Bronze	Total
1	Germany	8	4	1	13
2	Great Britain	4	6	1	11
3	Australia	2	1	2	5
4	New Zealand	2	1	0	3
5	France	0	3	8	11
6	Italy	0	1	2	3
7	Netherlands	0	0	2	2
Totals (7 entries)		16	16	16	48

=== Men U21 (2002-2026) ===
Rank	Nation	Gold	Silver	Bronze	Total
1	France	4	2	2	8
2	Spain	4	0	1	5
3	Great Britain	3	1	1	5
4	Germany	2	3	3	8
5	Denmark	0	3	0	3
6	Netherlands	0	2	0	2
7	Italy	0	1	5	6
8	New Zealand	0	1	0	1
9	Japan	0	0	1	1
Totals (9 entries)		13	13	13	39

=== Women U21 (2002-2026) ===
Rank	Nation	Gold	Silver	Bronze	Total
1	Germany	5	2	1	8
2	France	2	2	0	4
3	New Zealand	1	1	5	7
4	Spain	1	1	1	3
5	Poland	0	3	0	3
6	Great Britain	0	0	1	1
6	Japan	0	0	1	1
Totals (7 entries)		9	9	9	27

- Not held in 2004, 2006 and 2008.

=== Total (1987-2026) ===
Rank	Nation	Gold	Silver	Bronze	Total
1	Germany	18	16	8	42
2	France	10	10	12	32
3	Great Britain	9	8	5	22
4	Spain	5	2	5	12
5	Australia	5	1	2	8
6	Netherlands	3	4	4	11
7	New Zealand	3	3	5	11
8	Italy	2	5	11	18
9	Denmark	0	3	1	4
10	Poland	0	3	0	3
11	Japan	0	0	2	2
Totals (11 entries)		55	55	55	165

== See also ==
- International Canoe Federation
- Canoe polo at the World Games
- European Canoe Polo Championships
- Asian Canoe Polo Championships
- Oceania Canoe Polo Championships
- African Canoe Polo Championships
- Pan American Canoe Polo Championships
- Italy women's national canoe polo team
- Italy men's national canoe polo team

== Sources ==
- ICF Historic Results
- Summary
