= 2018 ICF Canoe Polo World Championships =

The 2018 ICF Canoe Polo World Championships were held in Welland, Ontario, Canada.

== Medals summary ==
Event	Gold	Silver	Bronze
Men	Germany (GER)	Italy (ITA)	Spain (ESP)
Women	Germany (GER)	Great Britain (GBR)	Italy (ITA)
Men Under-21	Great Britain (GBR)	Germany (GER)	Italy (ITA)
Women Under-21	Germany (GER)	Poland (POL)	New Zealand (NZL)
