= Croatian Canoe Federation =

Governing body of canoeing in Croatia

- Sport: Canoeing
- Founded: 1939
- Affiliation: International Canoe Federation
- Regional affiliation: European Canoe Association
- President: Marko Ćurković

Official website
- www.kajak.hr
- (Croatia)

The Croatian Canoe Federation (Croatian: Hrvatski kajakaški savez) is the governing body of rowing in Croatia. It organizes the Croatian representation at international competitions and the Croatian National Championships.

The Federation was formed on August 6, 1939 in Zagreb. It became a member of the International Canoe Federation in 1992 and of the European Canoe Association in 1993.
