= Buoyancy aid =

Flotation aid worn by kayakers, canoeists and dinghy sailors

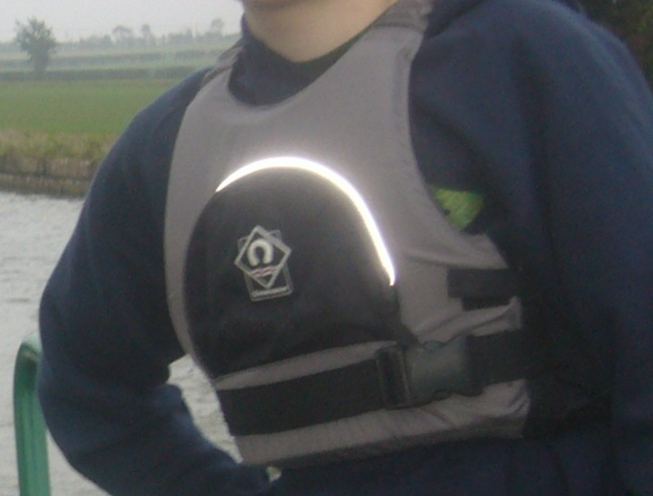
A person wearing a buoyancy aid with a reflective strip

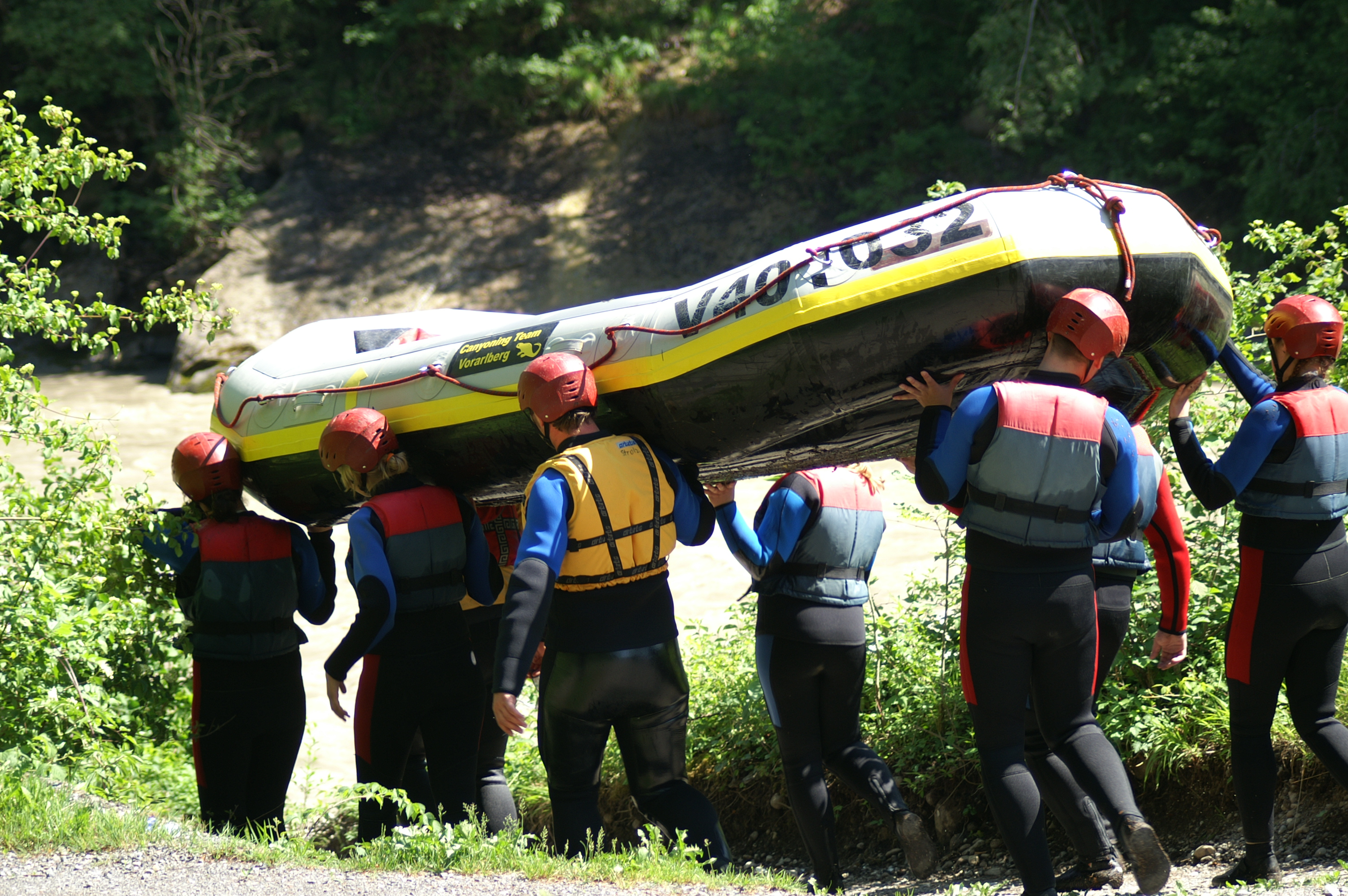
A group carrying their inflatable raft to the start of a river rafting tour. They wear buoyancy aids typical for the use in various paddle sports.

Buoyancy aids are a specialist form of personal flotation device (PFD) used most commonly by kayakers, canoeists, people practicing rafting, and dinghy sailors. They are designed as a flotation aid, rather than merely a life-saving device and have several key differences to other PFD's and lifejackets. Some buoyancy aids may not provide the same high level of protection as lifejackets.

Canoeing and kayaking buoyancy aids are designed with mobility in mind. A buoyancy aid that does not fit properly can restrict a paddler's (kayaker's) range of movement, which could cause them to tire or prevent them from paddling properly. They typically have front and back foam buoyancy, with none or very little around the sides to allow for better arm movements.

== Types of Buoyancy Aid ==
All canoeing and kayaking buoyancy aids are made with a foam core, instead of being inflatable like some life jackets. This removes the possibility of them bursting or not being activated in the case of an incapacitated paddler. The foam used is typically closed cell PVC (polyvinyl chloride), although some manufacturers are now starting to use less toxic and more recyclable materials. Older designs used vertically aligned ribs of foam all around the body, but more modern designs typically feature front and rear slabs of foam buoyancy, with the sides left clear to allow unrestricted rotation and arm movement. Most buoyancy aids are one of three basic designs:

- Over the head vest, where the one-piece vest is pulled on over the head.
- Front zip jacket, where the buoyancy aid is worn like a regular jacket, zipped up at the front. This design limits the front-buoyancy as it requires two separate blocks of foam and a gap for the zip.
- Side zip is a combination of the other two, with a zip on the side rather than along the front. The added gap in one side makes it easier to get the vest on, and means that the front buoyancy can be one whole piece.

All buoyancy aids include some form of strap for tightening the buoyancy aid, preventing it from coming off in the water. Many white water designs feature multiple straps on the shoulders and waist to ensure the buoyancy aid can not be swept off in fast water. They may also include pockets for storing equipment and a range of safety and rescue features. Some lower quality ones only offer a belt, and these are often poor fitting and may be designed for generic water sports rather than specifically canoeing/kayaking.

There is a large variety of designs to fit every figure and purpose. It is important to have a buoyancy aid that fits comfortably, allowing freedom of movement. It is also important that it is suitable for the chosen discipline and the grade of water being paddled. Each discipline has different requirements and although one buoyancy aid can be used for multiple disciplines, there are several factors to consider which type to choose.

=== Canoe polo and slalom ===
These are designed with high maneuverability as a key feature, often at the expense of buoyancy. Minimalistic designs which tend to hug the body tightly and are well cut around the arms aim to allow the wearer complete freedom of motion (something important to both Slalom and Polo paddlers as well as playboaters). These vests may not be fully suitable for other purposes, such as whitewater paddling where additional buoyancy is required due to the higher flow of water. Canoe polo rules specify that the buoyancy aids must have protective buoyancy at the sides of the garment, resulting in a garment that has more overall coverage

=== Sea and touring ===
Buoyancy aids for sea and long-distance touring often feature several large pockets for storing essential equipment, and many also accommodate hydration packs. They have to be comfortable to wear whilst paddling for long distances, and so typically have very low cut sides to allow the arms free movement. More recently they are being designed more and more like whitewater vests, with low cut fronts to allow the paddler to lean forward easily.

=== Whitewater ===
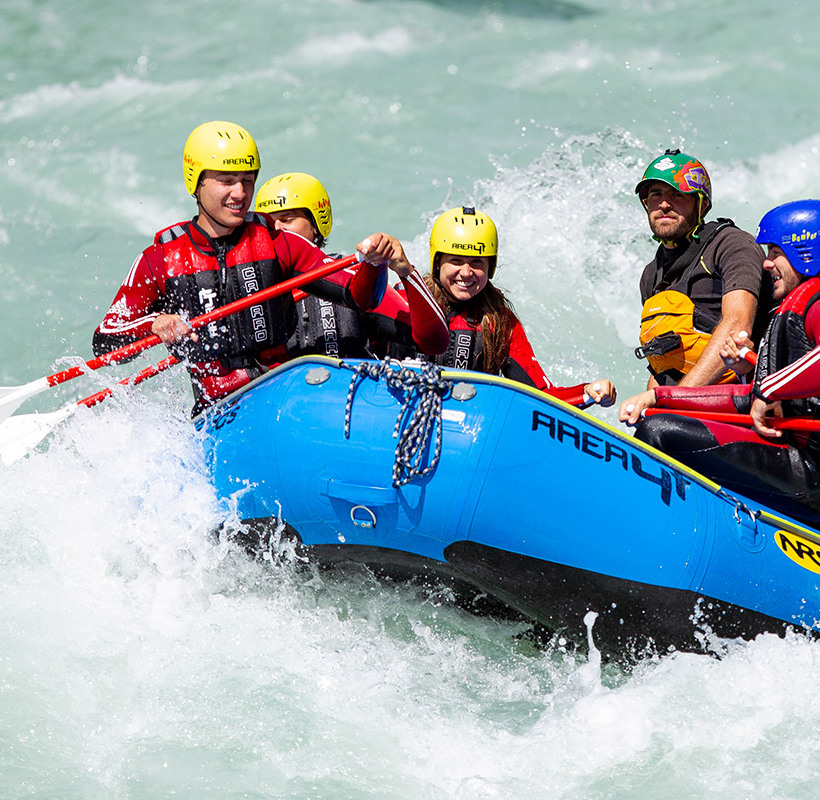
Rafting is a watersport where buoyancy aids worn over a wetsuit are mandatory and often required by law, due to the constant risk of falling off the boat and into the wild water

Whitewater buoyancy aids are designed to provide enough buoyancy in fast whitewater rivers, should the paddler capsize and leave the kayak. They are often more bulky than Slalom/Polo vests, but are usually cut short at the front to allow the paddler to lean further forward despite the thicker foam and allow good trunk rotation for quick turns. They always have shoulder and side straps to ensure they are not swept off in fast rapids.

They typically feature one or two pockets to store basic essentials such as a rescue knife, carabiner and tow-line. Many often also feature harnesses for use in rescues, however these are often used without proper training and can become more of a danger to both the rescuer and the swimmer if used incorrectly.

As an example, WW harnesses require a significant load to release effectively, (usually provided by the force of the water, when a rescuer in the river is held by rope from the bank). Without this load the harness may not release. So it is not a good idea to use these for low load situations, (e.g. towing kayaks), and in an incident it is necessary to get the rescuer to release from the harness, and not allow the person on the bank to release their end as the rescuer would end up swimming down river with 30+ metres of slack rope on their back. Training therefore is vital to avoid such situations.

== Specifications ==
Buoyancy aids come with a set of specifications detailing their sizing, weight range, and the standards they adhere to. This is often in a table printed onto the inside of the buoyancy aid, or a label on the bag/box. Most companies give the specifications for each of their models on all of their buoyancy aids, to simplify the manufacturing process, so it is important to check the model and size range of any particular buoyancy aid.

Buoyancy aids should detail:

- Chest size: Usually a range either in inches or centimetres.
- Weight range: Either in kilograms or pounds.
- Force provided: The buoyant force provided by the buoyancy aid.

For a buoyancy aid to be sold in the European Union, it must be C.E. tested and approved.

- In the US, a buoyancy aid may be approved by the United States Coast Guard (although this is not a requirement). Most canoeing and kayaking buoyancy aids class as "Type III Flotation Aids", which means they provide a minimum of 15.5 lbf (pounds-force) (69 N) of buoyancy.

=== The 50N Buoyancy aid ===
Buoyancy aids with providing only 50 N of force should only be used by swimmers in sheltered waters when help is close at hand. They are not guaranteed to turn a person from a face-down position in the water.

== Ageing ==
The foam used in buoyancy aids does degrade with age. Manufacturers add additional foam to ensure that their buoyancy aids will still provide enough force even after years of use. A rough life expectancy is three years of use, although buoyancy aids exposed to polluted water may degrade faster than normally expected. In practice buoyancy aids far exceed a 3-year service life expectancy, and can be tested for buoyancy using a weight. The other issues are damage, stitching and wear. Buoyancy aid and personal flotation devices need regular and routine inspection of any belts, stitching and other parts. This wear and damage serve as valuable indicators on when to retire a personal flotation service or buoyancy aid.

== Harnesses ==
Many white water buoyancy aids, as well as some sea kayak ones, feature a safety harness. These fit around the buoyancy aid below the arms and can be used for Live Bait Rescues (where a rescuer swims out into the river on a line to rescue a swimmer) or for anchoring a belayer onto the bank. They feature quick-release buckles to quickly remove the harness, and these are often (but not always) designed to release automatically past a certain load/pressure. Often harnesses have a metal ring at the back for attaching a rope with a screwgate carabiner. Use of a non-locking carabiner can allow the carabiner to accidentally clip onto other straps on the buoyancy aid during use, thus preventing the harness from being released, and as such are not designed to be used for attaching to a harness.

Many harnesses feature a metal friction plate which stops the belt from slipping under high-load situations, however these can also prevent the harness coming off when swimming and as such present more of a hazard than an aid. It is often recommended that the belt be removed from within the friction plate and only threaded back through if the situation requires an anchored belay.

Improvised harnesses (ropes around the waist, belts, or attaching ropes directly onto the buoyancy aid itself) can present a serious danger to the wearer, as they can not be released or may not be strong enough to withstand the load required.

== Pet buoyancy aid ==
In recent years pet buoyancy aids have become quite popular. A web search or visit to a pet supply store will reveal many types and brands of pet buoyancy aids including full life jackets, vests, and flotation collars. The purpose, design, and composition of these buoyancy aids are very similar to the human version with the major difference being that pet buoyancy aids are not usually required by law, also they are generally not certified by the Coast Guard or any other government department.

== History ==
Ancient instances of the life jacket can be traced back to simple blocks of wood or cork used by Norwegian seamen. The modern life jacket is generally credited to one Captain Ward, a Royal National Lifeboat Institution inspector in the United Kingdom, who, in 1854, created a cork vest to be worn by lifeboat crews for both weather protection and buoyancy.
