= Asian Canoe Polo Championships =

- Status: Active
- Genre: Sporting Event
- Date: Mid-Year
- Frequency: Biennial
- Country: Varying
- Inaugurated: 1985

The Asian Canoe Pole Championships is the top Asian canoe pole event for national teams, managed by the Asian Canoe Confederation (ACC).

== History ==
Its history dates back to 1985, when the first Asian Championships were held in Japan, at that time only in the men's category. It was not until the 8th Asian Championships in China in 1999 that a women's tournament was organized in addition to the men's category. The championships are held every 2 years. In the men's category, the tournament is dominated by teams from East Asia, and in the women's category, by the Iranian team.

== Qualification ==
The championships also serve as a continental qualification for the World Championships or the canoe polo tournament at the World Games.

== Ranking ==
=== Senior ===
Ranking + Results

#	Year	Venue	Men			Women		
#	Year	Venue	1st	2nd	3rd	1st	2nd	3rd
1	1985	Tokyo, Japan	HKG	JPN	MAS	—		
2	1987	Zhaoqing, China	HKG A	HKG B	JPN	—		
3	1989	Jakarta, Indonesia	HKG A	HKG B	JPN	—		
4	1991	Ōtsu, Japan	HKG	JPN	INA	—		
5	1993	Hiroshima, Japan	INA	TPE	JPN	—		
6	1995	Chengdu, China	HKG	JPN	INA	—		
7	1997	Sokcho, South Korea	INA	HKG	JPN	—		
8	1999	Changde, China	TPE	HKG	IRI	JPN	TPE	HKG
9	2002	Tehran, Iran	JPN	IRI	TPE	JPN	IRI	TPE
10	2003	Tainan, Taiwan	TPE	JPN	IRI	JPN	TPE	HKG
11	2005	Putrajaya, Malaysia	TPE	JPN	IRI	IRI	SGP	JPN
12	2007	Hwacheon, South Korea	TPE	JPN	IRI	IRI	JPN	TPE
13	2009	Hualien, Taiwan	TPE	JPN	IRI	IRI	SGP	TPE
14	2011	Tehran, Iran	IRI	JPN	TPE	IRI	TPE	JPN
15	2013	New Delhi, India	TPE	JPN	IRI	IRI	SGP	JPN
16	2015	Hong Kong	JPN	TPE	IRI	SGP	IRI	TPE
17	2017	Sungai Mati, Malaysia	IRI	JPN	TPE	TPE	IRI	SGP
18	2023	Singapore	IRI; TPE	—	JPN	TPE	SGP	IRI
19	2025	Putrajaya, Malaysia						

- 2019 was played with Asian Cup Name (CHN).
- 2021 was cancelled (SIN).
- 2019 Asia Cup Results - Men: Japan,Iran,Chinese Taipei Women: Singapore,Chinese Taipei,Iran
- 2023 shared gold due rainy weather.
- 2025 19th Asian Canoe Polo Championship, Putrajaya, Malaysia, 10–14 September 2025.

=== U21 ===
#	Year	Venue	Men U21			Women U21		
#	Year	Venue	1st	2nd	3rd	1st	2nd	3rd
1	1985	Tokyo, Japan	No Competition			No Competition		
2	1987	Zhaoqing, China	No Competition			No Competition		
3	1989	Jakarta, Indonesia	No Competition			No Competition		
4	1991	Ōtsu, Japan	No Competition			No Competition		
5	1993	Hiroshima, Japan	No Competition			No Competition		
6	1995	Chengdu, China	No Competition			No Competition		
7	1997	Sokcho, South Korea	No Competition			No Competition		
8	1999	Changde, China	No Competition			No Competition		
9	2002	Tehran, Iran	No Competition			No Competition		
10	2003	Tainan, Taiwan	No Competition			No Competition		
11	2005	Putrajaya, Malaysia	No Competition			No Competition		
12	2007	Hwacheon, South Korea	IRI	JPN	TPE	No Competition		
13	2009	Hualien, Taiwan	IRI	TPE	SIN	No Competition		
14	2011	Tehran, Iran	JPN	IRI	@	@@		
15	2013	New Delhi, India	IRI	TPE	SIN	@@		
16	2015	Hong Kong	TPE	IRI	JPN	IRI	SIN	THA
17	2017	Sungai Mati, Malaysia	TPE	IRI	MAS	TPE	IRI	SIN
18	2023	, Singapore	TPE	JPN	MAS	SIN	MAS	TPE
19	2025	, Malaysia						

- 2019 was played with Asian Cup Name (CHN) but there is no information about holding youth competitions.
- 2021 was cancelled (SIN).
- 2023
- @ = Only 2 Teams.
- @@ = The first edition of the Asian U21 Canoe Polo Championship in the girls' division was not held due to the lack of a quorum of participating teams in 2011 and 2013.

== 2019 Asian Cup ==
The 2019 Asian Canoe Polo Championships were held in Deqing, China, as part of the Asian Canoe Polo Cup. Singapore's Senior Women's team won gold in the Senior Women's category. The Senior Men's and U21 Men's teams from Singapore also participated, with the U21 team placing second in their division. The tournament also featured Chinese Taipei's U21 team, who won their division, and Malaysia's U21 team, who finished second.

Senior:

U21:

Senior M: 1- JPN 2- IRI 3- TPE

Senior W: 1- SIN 2- TPE 3- IRI

U21 M: 1- TPE 2- MAS 3- CHN

U21 W: 1- CHN 2- TPE 3- THA

== Asian Club Cup ==
1. 2024 in Malaysia
2. 2025 in Malaysia

== Medals ==
=== Men (1985-2023) ===
Rank	Nation	Gold	Silver	Bronze	Total
1	Chinese Taipei (TPE)	7	2	3	12
2	Hong Kong (HKG)	5	4	0	9
3	Iran (IRI)	3	1	7	11
4	Japan (JPN)	2	10	5	17
5	Indonesia (INA)	2	0	2	4
6	Malaysia (MAS)	0	0	1	1
Totals (6 entries)		19	17	18	54

- Shared Gold in 2023.

=== Women (1999-2023) ===
Rank	Nation	Gold	Silver	Bronze	Total
1	Iran (IRI)	5	3	1	9
2	Japan (JPN)	3	1	3	7
3	Chinese Taipei (TPE)	2	3	4	9
4	Singapore (SIN)	1	4	1	6
5	Hong Kong (HKG)	0	0	2	2
Totals (5 entries)		11	11	11	33

=== Men U21 (2013-2023) ===
Rank	Nation	Gold	Silver	Bronze	Total
1	Iran (IRI)	3	3	0	6
2	Chinese Taipei (TPE)	3	2	1	6
3	Japan (JPN)	1	2	1	4
4	Malaysia (MAS)	0	0	2	2
4	Singapore (SIN)	0	0	2	2
Totals (5 entries)		7	7	6	20

=== Women U21 (2015-2023) ===
Rank	Nation	Gold	Silver	Bronze	Total
1	Singapore (SIN)	1	1	1	3
2	Iran (IRI)	1	1	0	2
3	Chinese Taipei (TPE)	1	0	1	2
4	Malaysia (MAS)	0	1	0	1
5	Thailand (THA)	0	0	1	1
Totals (5 entries)		3	3	3	9

=== Total (1985-2023) ===
Rank	Nation	Gold	Silver	Bronze	Total
1	Chinese Taipei (TPE)	13	7	9	29
2	Iran (IRI)	12	8	8	28
3	Japan (JPN)	6	13	9	28
4	Hong Kong (HKG)	5	4	2	11
5	Singapore (SIN)	2	5	4	11
6	Indonesia (INA)	2	0	2	4
7	Malaysia (MAS)	0	1	3	4
8	Thailand (THA)	0	0	1	1
Totals (8 entries)		40	38	38	116

== Results ==
- "Today's Matches". The Roon Ba. Archived from the original on 2020-02-22.
- "Men's Canoe Polo - 2020 Results". The Roon Ba. 22 January 2020. Archived from the original on 2020-02-10.
- "Women's Canoe Polo - 2020 Results". The Roon Ba. 22 January 2020. Archived from the original on 2020-02-10.
- "Men's Canoe Polo - World Ranking". The Roon Ba. 19 February 2020. Archived from the original on 2020-02-25.
- "Women's Canoe Polo - World Ranking". The Roon Ba. 19 February 2020. Archived from the original on 2020-02-25.
- "Canoe Polo - Results". International Canoe Federation. 2024. Archived from the original on 17 March 2026.
- "ICF Canoe Polo World Ranking" (PDF). International Canoe Federation. 13 November 2024. Archived (PDF) from the original on 22 May 2025.
- "Asia Championships". International Canoe Federation. Archived from the original on 14 February 2014.
- Smale, Greg; Liu, Te-Chih (November 2007). "1st Asian Canoe Polo Championships § Japan - 1985" (PDF). International Canoe Federation. Archived from the original (PDF) on 21 January 2011.
- Smale, Greg; Liu, Te-Chih (November 2007). "2nd Asian Canoe Polo Championships § China - 1987" (PDF). International Canoe Federation. Archived from the original (PDF) on 21 January 2011.
- 1989
- Smale, Greg; Liu, Te-Chih (November 2007). "4th Asian Canoe Polo Championships § Japan - 1991" (PDF). International Canoe Federation. Archived from the original (PDF) on 16 January 2011.
- Smale, Greg; Liu, Te-Chih (November 2007). "4th Asian Canoe Polo Championships § Japan - 1991" (PDF). International Canoe Federation. Archived from the original (PDF) on 16 January 2011.
- Smale, Greg; Liu, Te-Chih (November 2007). "6th Asian Canoe Polo Championships § China - 1995" (PDF). International Canoe Federation. Archived from the original (PDF) on 21 January 2011.
- Smale, Greg; Liu, Te-Chih (November 2007). "7th Asian Canoe Polo Championships § Korea - 1997" (PDF). International Canoe Federation. Archived from the original (PDF) on 21 January 2011.
- Smale, Greg; Liu, Te-Chih (November 2007). "8th Asian Canoe Polo Championships § China - 1999" (PDF). International Canoe Federation. Archived from the original (PDF) on 21 January 2011.
- Smale, Greg; Liu, Te-Chih (November 2007). "9th Asian Canoe Polo Championships § Iran - 2002" (PDF). International Canoe Federation. Archived from the original (PDF) on 21 January 2011.
- 2003
- Smale, Greg (November 2007). "11th Asian Canoe Polo Championships - Putrajaya, Malaysia § 17th – 20th December 2005" (PDF). International Canoe Federation. Archived from the original (PDF) on 21 January 2011.
- Smale, Greg (November 2007). "12th Asian Canoe Polo Championships - Hwacheon, Korea Semptember 13-16 2007" (PDF). International Canoe Federation. Archived from the original (PDF) on 21 January 2011. [sic]
- "13th Asian Canoe Polo Championships 2009 - Hualien, Taiwan 10th – 14th June, 2009" (PDF). International Canoe Federation. Archived from the original (PDF) on 21 January 2011.
- "2017 ACC Asian Canoe Polo Championships – Final Rankings § 18th Asian Canoe Polo Championships - Batu Pahat Sri Medan Botani Garden, Johor, Malaysia" (PDF). International Canoe Federation. Archived (PDF) from the original on 13 August 2025.
- "EVENT REPORT: Asian Canoe Polo Championships 2023 Singapore" (PDF). International Canoe Federation. 12 November 2023. Archived (PDF) from the original on 13 August 2025.
- "Canoe Polo Asian Cup 2019 - Final results". Archived from the original on 17 August 2025.
- "Asian Canoe Polo Championships 2023 - Singapore - Final results". Archived from the original on 17 August 2025.
- "Past Results". Black Merlies Singapore. Archived from the original on 18 August 2025.
- "Canoe Polo". Singapore Canoe Federation. Archived from the original on 16 March 2026.

== See also ==
- Canoe Polo World Championships
- Canoe polo at the World Games
- European Canoe Polo Championships
- Canoe polo at the Asian Games

== Links ==
- http://www.asia-canoe.com/
- "Canoe Polo Competition Rules 2025" (PDF). International Canoe Federation. 1 January 2025. Archived (PDF) from the original on 16 August 2025.
- Soriano, Daniel (16 November 2024). "Canoe polo WC and Chengdu 2025 dreams hang in the balance in China". Inside The Games. Archived from the original on 27 October 2024.
- "General Schedule". Archived from the original on 29 August 2025.
- "Search Results". Archived from the original on 31 January 2026.
- "What is Canoe Polo?". International Canoe Federation. Archived from the original on 28 February 2026.
