= Canoe polo at the 2009 World Games =

- Venues: Lotus Pond
- Dates: 17–18 July 2009
- Competitors: 96 from 9 nations

The canoe polo events at the 2009 World Games in Kaohsiung was played between 17 and 18 July. 96 athletes, from 9 nations, participated in the tournament. The competition took place at Lotus Pond.

== Participating nations ==
- Australia (16)
- Chinese Taipei (16)
- France (16)
- Germany (8)
- Great Britain (8)
- Italy (8)
- Netherlands (8)
- New Zealand (8)
- Spain (8)

== Medal table ==
Rank	Nation	Gold	Silver	Bronze	Total
1	France	1	0	1	2
2	Great Britain	1	0	0	1
3	Germany	0	1	0	1
3	Netherlands	0	1	0	1
5	Australia	0	0	1	1
Totals (5 entries)		2	2	2	6

== Events ==
Event	Gold	Silver	Bronze
Men	France; François Barbey; Martin Brodoux; Thibault Chanuc; Manuel Courtin; Yves-Marie Denis; Maxime Gohier; Philippe Pfister; Nathan Souviraa	Netherlands; Robert Aitken; Thomas Bartels; Jeroen Dieperink; Jurjen Hallegraeff; Hagen Oligmüller; Wouter Ottjes; Michiel Schreurs; Paul Snijders	Australia; Duncan Cochrane; Chris Heard; Anton Holmes; Josh Holmes; Craig Hutchinson; Ian McIntosh; Matt Moore; Nathan Moore
Women	Great Britain; Zoe Anthony; Pru Blyth; Ellie Bridgestock; Ginny Coyles; Pip Grayson; Kathryn Grieves; Charlotte Lister; Kirsty Sutcliffe	Germany; Alexandra Bonk; Stefanie Esser; Elena Gilles; Tonie Lenz; Tanja Manegold; Christina Mantell; Caroline Sinsel; Regina Weinberger	France; Mélanie Biémont; Virginie Brackez; Annie Chevalier; Gaëlle François; Camille Girard; Justine Lefebvre; Valérie Sibioude; Jade Vassallo
