= Canoeing Ireland =

Irish sporting body

Irish Canoe Union
- Sport: Canoeing; Kayaking
- Jurisdiction: National (Republic of Ireland)
- Founded: 1960
- Headquarters: Sports Campus Ireland
- President: Lynda Byron
- CEO: Moira Aston

Official website
- www.canoe.ie
- (Republic of Ireland)

The Irish Canoe Union, known as Canoeing Ireland since 2012, is the governing body for paddlesports (canoeing and kayaking) in the Republic of Ireland. It has been affiliated with the Olympic Federation of Ireland since 1964. It is a member of the International Canoe Federation.

Athletes have represented the union at the 1972 Summer Olympics for kayaking, and 1992 Olympics for Canadian canoeing. Canoeing in Northern Ireland is regulated by the Canoe Association of Northern Ireland, a part of British Canoeing, but Northern Irish athletes may freely choose to represent Ireland at International level.

The union is funded through membership fees, sponsorship, and government grants through Sport Ireland. The organisation is led by a president, and chief executive officer.

== Olympians ==
- 2020
  - Liam Jegou (qualified due to the withdrawal of Robert Hendrick) C1M slalom
- 1972
  - Gerard Collins (canoeist), K1M slalom
  - Annie McQuaid K1W 500m
  - Howard Watkins K1M 1,000m
  - Brendan O'Connell, Howard Watkins K2M 1,000m

== Controversy ==
Michael Scanlon was suspended as chief executive officer in 2011, and the decision was the subject of a High Court battle. Another former CEO and Sporting Director, Karl Dunne, also took a High Court case.

== See also ==
- Liffey Descent Canoe Race

== Sources ==
- "Ireland and Olympism". Olympic Review (70–71): 431–443. September–October 1973 – via LA84.org.
