= Canoe polo at the World Games =

Canoe polo was part of the World Games at Duisburg in 2005.

== Medals ==
=== Men (2005-2025) ===
Rank	Nation	Gold	Silver	Bronze	Total
1	Germany	4	1	0	5
2	France	1	2	0	3
3	Netherlands	1	1	0	2
4	Italy	0	2	1	3
5	Great Britain	0	0	2	2
5	Spain	0	0	2	2
7	Australia	0	0	1	1
Totals (7 entries)		6	6	6	18

=== Women (2005-2025) ===
Rank	Nation	Gold	Silver	Bronze	Total
1	Germany	4	2	0	6
2	Great Britain	1	2	0	3
3	France	1	1	2	4
4	New Zealand	0	1	1	2
5	Italy	0	0	1	1
5	Japan	0	0	1	1
5	Netherlands	0	0	1	1
Totals (7 entries)		6	6	6	18

=== Total (2005-2025) ===
Rank	Nation	Gold	Silver	Bronze	Total
1	Germany	8	3	0	11
2	France	2	3	2	7
3	Great Britain	1	2	2	5
4	Netherlands	1	1	1	3
5	Italy	0	2	2	4
6	New Zealand	0	1	1	2
7	Spain	0	0	2	2
8	Australia	0	0	1	1
8	Japan	0	0	1	1
Totals (9 entries)		12	12	12	36

== Medalists ==
=== Men ===
Games	Gold	Silver	Bronze
2005 Duisburg	Netherlands (NED)	Germany (GER)	Great Britain (GBR)
2009 Kaohsiung	France (FRA)	Netherlands (NED)	Australia (AUS)
2013 Cali	Germany (GER)	France (FRA)	Italy (ITA)
2017 Wrocław	Germany (GER)	Italy (ITA)	Spain (ESP)
2022 Birmingham	Germany (GER)	France (FRA)	Spain (ESP)
2025 Chengdu	Germany (GER)	Italy (ITA)	Great Britain (GBR)

=== Women ===
Games	Gold	Silver	Bronze
2005 Duisburg	Germany (GER)	Great Britain (GBR)	Japan (JPN)
2009 Kaohsiung	Great Britain (GBR)	Germany (GER)	France (FRA)
2013 Cali	Germany (GER)	Great Britain (GBR)	France (FRA)
2017 Wrocław	Germany (GER)	France (FRA)	Italy (ITA)
2022 Birmingham	France (FRA)	Germany (GER)	New Zealand (NZL)
2025 Chengdu	Germany (GER)	New Zealand (NZL)	Netherlands (NED)

== See also ==
- Canoe Polo World Championships
- European Canoe Polo Championships
- Asian Canoe Polo Championships
