= Paddle Scotland =

National governing body for paddlesports in Scotland

Scottish Canoe Association Comann Curach na h-Alba
- Sport: Canoeing; Kayaking
- Abbreviation: SCA
- Founded: 1939
- Affiliation: British Canoeing
- President: David Simpson
- CEO: Stuart Smith
- Secretary: Steve Roebuck
- Coach: Jon Schofield

Official website
- www.paddlescotland.org.uk
- (Scotland)

Paddle Scotland, formerly the Scottish Canoe Association (Scots: Scots Canoe Associe; Scottish Gaelic: Comann Curach na h-Alba) or SCA, is the national governing body for canoeing, kayaking and other paddlesport in Scotland.

It covers all branches of the sport from recreational activities to canoe slalom; wildwater racing; flatwater sprint racing and marathon racing; canoe sailing; canoe polo; surf kayaking and canoeing; and extreme racing (including the international event on the Glen Nevis in Lochaber).

== History ==
The Scottish Canoe Association was founded in 1939. The association was founded by four canoe clubs: the Canoe Section of the Camping Club, Clyde Canoe Club, Forth Canoe Club (1934) and Scottish Youth Hostels Canoe Club.

In March 2024, the company rebranded themselves as Paddle Scotland.

As of 2024 they state that they have more than 80 affiliated clubs. The body now has approximately 3,000 individual members, including 1,750 qualified coaches.

== Performance ==
In March 2019, SCA announced double Olympic medallist Jon Schofield as their head of performance and pathways.

SCA Performance runs programmes in 2 Olympic disciplines, sprint and slalom canoeing. Rio 2016 saw the introduction of paracanoe in the Paralympic programme and SCA aim to support the identification of Scottish athletes to join the British canoeing programme centrally delivered in Nottingham High Performance Centre.

== Disciplines ==
There is a diverse range of different disciplines covered by Scottish Canoe Association. Along with the traditional competitive disciplines (including the two Olympic disciplines of Sprint and Slalom) there are several recreational disciplines:

- slalom
- stand up paddleboarding
- sea kayaking
- white water
- sprint
- marathon
- polo
- freestyle
- surf
- wild water racing
- sit on top
- canoe sailing
- open canoeing
- touring

== Regional development ==
SCA have 9 regions in Scotland. They are Borders, Central, Fife, Tayside, Grampian and Shetland, Highlands and Islands, Lothians, South West and West.

Each region has its own regional officer, whose purpose is to:

- Support the delivery of SCA strategy within the region
- Act as a regional contact for SCA members, affiliated clubs and centres linking them to SCA volunteers, committees and staff as appropriate
- Support SCA coaching and development work in the region
- Represent the SCA coaching service within the region
- Be a regional ambassador for SCA and British canoeing

== Governance ==
The SCA board is responsible for high-level planning, governance, and compliance with legislation. SCA committees deal with specific paddling development and planning and therefore play a key role in the delivery of SCA activities. The board and committees are strongly supported by employed staff in areas of coaching and development, performance and administration.

The Scottish Canoe Association (SCA) has recently formed an Ethics and Compliance Committee to uphold ethical standards and ensure regulatory compliance. This committee works alongside existing governance structures to promote integrity and accountability within the organization. This initiative reflects the SCA's commitment to transparent and ethical governance.
