= Canoe Association of Northern Ireland =

National governing body for paddlesports in Northern Ireland

- Sport: Canoeing; Kayaking
- Founded: 1964
- Affiliation: British Canoeing
- President: Stephen Craig
- Chairperson: Lee Campbell
- Secretary: Gareth Mahood

Official website
- www.cani.org.uk
- (Northern Ireland)

The Canoe Association of Northern Ireland (CANI) was formed in 1964 and is the governing body for canoeing and kayaking in Northern Ireland. CANI is the Northern Ireland Division of British Canoeing. British Canoeing is the governing body for the UK. CANI, through British Canoeing is affiliated to the International Canoe Federation.

It covers all branches of the sport from recreational activities to whitewater racing, slalom racing; flatwater sprint and marathon racing; canoe polo; and surf kayaking.

CANI has some 1500 individual members of whom about 400 are coaches. There are also 250 affiliated members, these are paddlers who are members of affiliated clubs. Currently 22 clubs and organisations are affiliated to CANI.

On 14 March 2024, the organisation announced an extraordinary general meeting for 8 April 2024 with the proposal: "It is proposed that the name of the company be changed to Paddle Northern Ireland". This is intended to match the rebranding of British Canoeing to Paddle UK.

== See also ==
- Canoeing Ireland
