= Armenian National Rowing and Canoe Federation =

Sporting Organization

Armenian National Rowing and Canoe Federation logo

The Armenian National Rowing and Canoe Federation (Armenian: Թիավարության և կանոեի Հայաստանի ազգային ֆեդերացիա), is the regulating body of rowing, canoeing and kayaking in Armenia. The headquarters of the federation is located in Yerevan.

== History ==
The president of the Federation is Vahan Adamyan. The Federation is a member of the International Canoe Federation, the European Canoe Association, and the World Rowing Federation.

== See also ==
- Sport in Armenia
