= Canoe Wales =

Governing body of paddlesports in Wales

Canŵ Cymru Canoe Wales
- Sport: Paddlesport; Canoeing; Kayaking
- Affiliation: Paddle UK

Official website
- www.canoewales.com
- (Wales)

Canoe Wales (Welsh: Canŵ Cymru) is the national governing body for paddlesport in Wales. It covers all branches of the sport from recreational canoeing, kayaking, stand up paddleboarding and rafting to whitewater racing, slalom racing and wildwater racing; flatwater sprint racing and marathon racing; canoe sailing; canoe polo; surf kayaking and canoeing; and extreme racing. The organisation has over 2,700 members including individual paddlers as well as affiliated club members. Full adult members of Canoe Wales are also by default Welsh members of Paddle UK.

== History ==
Formerly known as the Welsh Canoeing Association, it was in the past responsible for the formal access agreements on the Conwy, Glaslyn, Llwyd, Ogwr, Severn, Tawe, Tryweryn, Twrch, Usk and Wye and informal agreements on rivers and managed still waters. However, following conflicts of interest, it has disavowed access agreements and begun to seek a legislative solution to access problems hoping for a parallel to the Land Reform (Scotland) Act 2003. It is also responsible for the rights of navigation agreements on sections of the Lugg, Severn and Wye. Canoe Wales organises competition at national and international level in all the canoeing and kayaking disciplines in Wales: freestyle; slalom; wild water racing; marathon racing; sprint racing; surf kayaking; and canoe polo.

== Responsibilities ==
Canoe Wales manages Canolfan Tryweryn, the National Whitewater Centre near Bala, Gwynedd, where the organisation is based. The Afon Tryweryn is a dam released river, allowing water to flow when other rivers are running dry, providing a year-round white water venue.
