= International scale of river difficulty =

Scale of skill needed to navigate a section of river

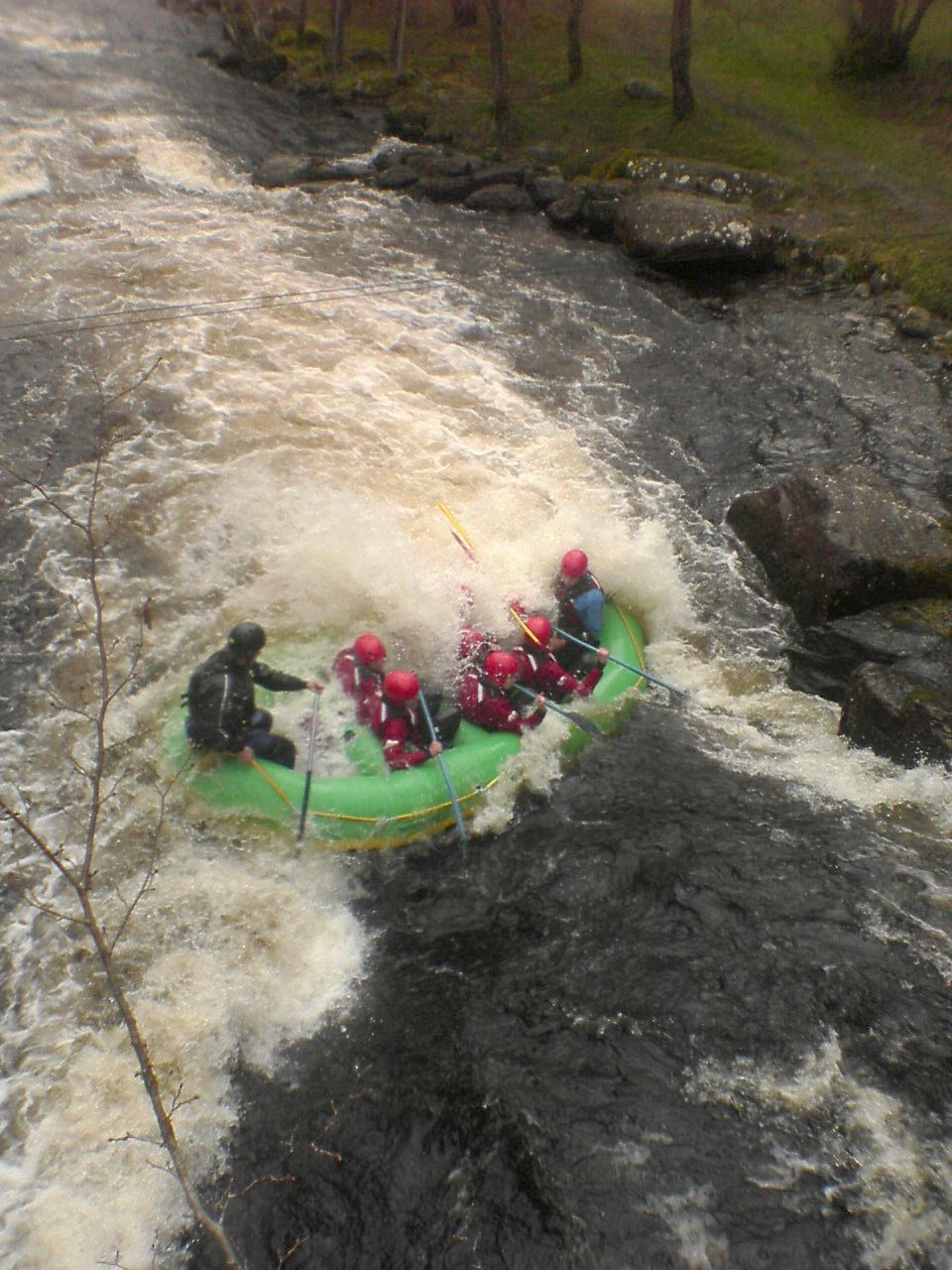
Class III rapid at Canolfan Tryweryn, Wales.

The international scale of river difficulty is an American system used to rate the difficulty of navigating a stretch of river, or a single (sometimes whitewater) rapid. The scale was created by the American Whitewater Association to evaluate rivers throughout the world, hence international in the title. It should not be confused with the internationally used whitewater scale, which is published and adapted by a committee of the International Canoe Federation (ICF). The grade reflects the technical difficulty and skill level required associated with the section of river. The scale is of use to various water sports and activities, such as rafting, riverboarding, whitewater canoeing, stand up paddle surfing, and whitewater kayaking.

== Classification ==
There are six categories, each referred to as grade or class followed by a number. The scale is not linear, nor is it fixed. For instance, there can be difficult grade twos, easy grade threes, and so on. The grade of a river may (and usually does) change with the level of flow. Often a river or rapid will be given a numerical grade, and then a plus (+) or minus (-) to indicate if it is in the higher or lower end of the difficulty level.

While a river section may be given an overall grading, it may contain sections above that grade, often noted as features, or conversely, it may contain sections of lower graded water as well. Details of portages may be given if these pose specific challenges.

A summary of river classifications as presented by the American Whitewater Association:

Class I: Easy	Fast moving water with riffles and small waves. Few obstructions, all obvious and easily missed with little training. Risk to swimmers is slight; self-rescue is easy.
Class II: Novice	Straightforward rapids with wide, clear channels which are evident without scouting. Occasional maneuvering may be required, but rocks and medium-sized waves are easily avoided by trained paddlers. Swimmers are seldom injured and group assistance, while helpful, is seldom needed. Rapids that are at the upper end of this difficulty range are designated Class II+.
Class III: Intermediate	Rapids with moderate, irregular waves which may be difficult to avoid and which can swamp an open canoe. Complex maneuvers in fast current and good boat control in tight passages or around ledges are often required; large waves or strainers may be present but are easily avoided. Strong eddies and powerful current effects can be found, particularly on large-volume rivers. Scouting is advisable for inexperienced parties. Injuries while swimming are rare; self-rescue is usually easy but group assistance may be required to avoid long swims. Rapids that are at the lower or upper end of this difficulty range are designated Class III- or Class III+ respectively.
Class IV: Advanced	Intense, powerful but predictable rapids requiring precise boat handling in turbulent water. Depending on the character of the river, it may feature large, unavoidable waves and holes or constricted passages demanding fast maneuvers under pressure. A fast, reliable eddy turn may be needed to initiate maneuvers, scout rapids, or rest. Rapids may require "must make" moves above dangerous hazards. Scouting may be necessary the first time down. Risk of injury to swimmers is moderate to high, and water conditions may make self-rescue difficult. Group assistance for rescue is often essential but requires practiced skills. For kayakers, a strong roll is highly recommended. Rapids that are at the lower or upper end of this difficulty range are designated Class IV- or Class IV+ respectively.
Class V: Expert	Extremely long, obstructed, or very violent rapids which expose a paddler to added risk. Drops may contain large, unavoidable waves and holes or steep, congested chutes with complex, demanding routes. Rapids may continue for long distances between pools, demanding a high level of fitness. What eddies exist may be small, turbulent, or difficult to reach. At the high end of the scale, several of these factors may be combined. Scouting is recommended but may be difficult. Swims are dangerous, and rescue is often difficult even for experts. Proper equipment, extensive experience, and practiced rescue skills are essential. Because of the large range of difficulty that exists beyond Class IV, Class V is an open-ended, multiple-level scale designated by class 5.0, 5.1, 5.2, etc. Each of these levels is an order of magnitude more difficult than the last. That is, going from Class 5.0 to Class 5.1 is a similar order of magnitude as increasing from Class IV to Class 5.0.
Class VI: Extreme and Exploratory Rapids	Runs of this classification are rarely attempted and often exemplify the extremes of difficulty, unpredictability and danger. The consequences of errors are severe and rescue may be impossible. For teams of experts only, at favorable water levels, after close personal inspection and taking all precautions. After a Class VI rapid has been run many times, its rating may be changed to an appropriate Class 5.x rating.

== Caution in application ==
Classifications can vary enormously, depending on the skill level and experience of the paddlers who rated the river. For example, at the 1999 International Conference on Outdoor Recreation and Education, an author of a paddling guide pointed out that there is too much variation in what is covered by the Class I designation, and proposed making further distinctions within the Class I flat water designations and Class I+ moving water designations, with the goal of providing better information for canoeists, instructors leading trips, and families with young children.

The grade of a river or rapid is likely to change along with the level of the water. High water usually makes rapids more difficult and dangerous, although some rapids may be easier at high flows because features are covered or washed out. At spate/flood stage, even rapids which are usually easy can contain lethal and unpredictable hazards. Conversely, some rapids may be easier with lower water levels when dangerous hydraulics become easier to manage. Some rivers with high volumes of fast moving water may require little maneuvering, but will pose serious risk of injury or death in the event of a capsize.

== See also ==
- Degree of difficulty
