= European Canoe Polo Championships =

- Status: Active
- Genre: Sporting Event
- Date: Mid-Year
- Frequency: Biennial
- Country: Varying
- Inaugurated: 1995

European Canoe Polo Championships is the main canoe polo championships in Europe by European Canoe Association.

== History ==
The European Canoe Pole Championships are the European premier event for national canoe pole teams, governed by the European Canoe Association (ECA). Its history dates back to 1993, when the first unofficial European Men's and Women's Championships were held in the United Kingdom. Their results are therefore not included in historical tables, but they are nevertheless a milestone in the promotion of canoe polo on a European and world scale. The first official European Men's and Women's Championships were held in Italy in 1995. They are held every 2 years.

In 1990, the European Nations Cup was held in France, which was not under the auspices of the International Canoe Federation (ICF) (the ECA did not exist at the time), with the participation of 5 men's teams. Since 2001, the championships have been held in addition to the men's and women's categories, as well as in the men's under-21 and women's under-21 categories.

== Editions ==
#	Year	City	Country	Dates	Men's Winners	Women's Winners	Teams (M+W)
1993–1999: Only Senior
0	1993	Sheffield	Great Britain		Germany	Germany	9 + 5
1	1995	Rome	Italy		Great Britain	Great Britain	10 + 4
2	1997	Essen	Germany		France	Great Britain	14 + 6
3	1999	Mechelen	Belgium		France	Germany	15 + 8
Since 2001: Senior + U21
4	2001	Bydgoszcz	Poland		Germany	Great Britain	15 + 9
5	2003	Kilcock	Ireland		Netherlands	Germany	14 + 11
6	2005	Madrid	Spain		Germany	Great Britain	14 + 13
7	2007	Thury-Harcourt	France		Netherlands	Germany	14 + 10
8	2009	Essen	Germany		Italy	Great Britain	15 + 9
9	2011	Madrid	Spain	5-11 September	France	Great Britain	14 + 11
10	2013	Poznań	Poland	22-25 August	Germany	Germany	17 + 10
11	2015	Essen	Germany	27–30 August	Germany	Germany	18 + 12
12	2017	Saint-Omer	France	23–27 August	Spain	Germany	17 + 12
13	2019	Coimbra	Portugal	26 August - 1 September	Germany	Great Britain	15 + 9
14	2021	Catania	Italy	4–10 October	Germany	France	14 + 10
15	2023	Brandenburg	Germany	7–10 September	Denmark	Germany	13 + 9
16	2025	Avranches	France	8–14 September	Spain	Germany	12 + 11

== Ranking ==
Ranking + Results

== Medals ==
=== Men (1993-2025) ===
Rank	Nation	Gold	Silver	Bronze	Total
1	Germany (GER)	7	6	0	13
2	France (FRA)	3	2	4	9
3	Netherlands (NED)	2	0	3	5
4	Spain (ESP)	2	0	1	3
5	Great Britain (GBR)	1	6	3	10
6	Italy (ITA)	1	3	6	10
7	Denmark (DEN)	1	0	0	1
Totals (7 entries)		17	17	17	51

=== Women (1993-2025) ===
Rank	Nation	Gold	Silver	Bronze	Total
1	Germany (GER)	9	4	2	15
2	Great Britain (GBR)	7	3	2	12
3	France (FRA)	1	6	8	15
4	Netherlands (NED)	0	3	2	5
5	Spain (ESP)	0	1	0	1
6	Italy (ITA)	0	0	2	2
7	Switzerland (SUI)	0	0	1	1
Totals (7 entries)		17	17	17	51

=== Men U21 (2001-2025) ===
Rank	Nation	Gold	Silver	Bronze	Total
1	France (FRA)	7	2	0	9
2	Germany (GER)	3	6	2	11
3	Spain (ESP)	1	1	2	4
4	Italy (ITA)	1	1	1	3
5	Great Britain (GBR)	1	0	0	1
6	Denmark (DEN)	0	2	0	2
7	Netherlands (NED)	0	1	2	3
8	Poland (POL)	0	0	3	3
9	Ireland (IRL)	0	0	1	1
9	Russia (RUS)	0	0	1	1
9	Switzerland (SUI)	0	0	1	1
Totals (11 entries)		13	13	13	39

=== Women U21 (2001-2025) ===
Rank	Nation	Gold	Silver	Bronze	Total
1	Germany (GER)	9	1	1	11
2	France (FRA)	1	5	3	9
3	Netherlands (NED)	1	0	1	2
3	Spain (ESP)	1	0	1	2
5	Poland (POL)	0	4	1	5
6	Great Britain (GBR)	0	2	3	5
7	Belgium (BEL)	0	0	1	1
7	Italy (ITA)	0	0	1	1
Totals (8 entries)		12	12	12	36

- U21 Women not held in 2003.

=== Total (1993-2025) ===
Rank	Nation	Gold	Silver	Bronze	Total
1	Germany (GER)	28	17	5	50
2	France (FRA)	12	15	15	42
3	Great Britain (GBR)	9	11	8	28
4	Spain (ESP)	4	2	4	10
5	Netherlands (NED)	3	4	8	15
6	Italy (ITA)	2	4	10	16
7	Denmark (DEN)	1	2	0	3
8	Poland (POL)	0	4	4	8
9	Switzerland (SUI)	0	0	2	2
10	Belgium (BEL)	0	0	1	1
10	Ireland (IRL)	0	0	1	1
10	Russia (RUS)	0	0	1	1
Totals (12 entries)		59	59	59	177

== See also ==
- Canoe Polo World Championships
- Canoe polo at the World Games
- Asian Canoe Polo Championships

== Links ==
- de:Kanupolo#Europameisterschaften
- https://sk.wikipedia.org/wiki/Panamerick%C3%A9_majstrovstv%C3%A1_v_canoe_pole
- sk:Majstrovstvá Ázie v canoe pole
