= Paddle UK =

Governing body for paddlesports in the UK

- Sport: Canoeing; Kayaking
- Jurisdiction: National
- Founded: 1936
- Headquarters: National Water Sports Centre, Adbolton Lane, West Bridgford, Nottinghamshire, NG12 2LU
- Chairman: Nick Donald
- CEO: Ashley Metcalf
- Replaced: British Canoeing
- (founded): 1887

Official website
- paddleuk.org.uk
- (United Kingdom)

Paddle UK is a national governing body in the United Kingdom for canoeing, kayaking and other paddlesports such as standup paddleboarding. Established in 1936 as the British Canoe Union, it federalised in 2000 to become the umbrella organisation for the home nation associations in Scotland (Scottish Canoe Association), Wales (Canoe Wales) and Northern Ireland (Canoe Association of Northern Ireland). In 2015 it took on the name British Canoeing and amalgamated the former British Canoe Union, Canoe England and GB Canoeing. In March 2024, British Canoeing changed their name to Paddle UK.

== Function ==
Paddle UK is responsible for leading and setting the overall framework for the National Associations; representing canoeing interests such as coaching and competition at UK and international level.

It formulates standards for training programmes with certification levels. It administers a range of personal performance awards and coaching awards, some of which are recognised by the UK Coaching Certificate.

== History ==
1887 saw the formation of the British Canoe Association, which lasted about thirty years. Revived in 1933, it merged with the Canoe Section of the Camping Club of Great Britain. In March 1936, representatives of the Canoe Section of the Camping Club, Clyde Canoe Club, Manchester Canoe Club, and the Royal Canoe Club, formed the British Canoe Union. It was incorporated as a company on 30 October 1980.

The British Canoe Union operated as a membership organisation for canoeists (paddlers) resident in England and worked in cooperation with its counterparts in the other home nations: Scotland (Scottish Canoe Association – SCA), Wales (Canoe Wales) and Northern Ireland (Canoe Association of Northern Ireland – CANI), at first informally and then through a series of agreements reached in 1976 and in 2018. The BCU rebranded as British Canoeing in 2014 and in the most recent agreement great care was taken to define each party's responsibility – where British Canoeing was fulfilling its GB role and where it was acting as the delivery body for England. Fulfilling both roles made British Canoeing different from the National Associations for Scotland, Wales and Northern Ireland but the agreement ensured mutual understanding and support.

In 2014 the organisation started rebranding, "Going forward, the British Canoe Union, Canoe England & GB Canoeing will be known collectively as British Canoeing."

With the growing popularity of stand up paddleboarding, further rebranding occurred in 2024, with the organisation changing their name to Paddle UK.

== Structure ==
Paddle UK is a membership organisation for canoeists, kayakers and other paddlers resident in England and it also carries out certain UK-wide roles on behalf of itself and the other 3 home nation associations: The Scottish Canoe Association, The Welsh Canoeing Association, and The Canoe Association of Northern Ireland, most particularly the training and organisation of international teams which participate in competitions under the control of the International Canoe Federation. It is concerned with all paddlesports, recreational as well as competitive, in open and closed craft, paddled with single and double-bladed paddles, on inland and coastal waters as well as open ocean.

Paddle UK is headquartered at the National Water Sports Centre in Nottinghamshire, England, which was until recently also the base of Canoe England. Previously they were based in Bingham, Nottinghamshire.

The organisation creates the rules for competitive canoeing used throughout the UK and has over 30,000 individual members, 625 affiliated clubs, and 145 approved centres. It is unique among national sporting certifying bodies in requiring continuous membership for qualifications to remain valid; thus its membership is not strictly voluntary and may not accurately reflect the organisation's popularity.

== Waterways licences ==
Many waterways in England and Wales are managed for boat traffic by a Navigation Authority. On these waterways all boat traffic, including unpowered craft such as rowing boats and canoes, require a licence. Paddle UK provides its members with a licence to use their canoes, kayaks, and SUPs on most of these managed waterways, including those managed by the two largest Navigation Authorities: the Canal & River Trust and the Environment Agency. This means the members do not need to buy separate licence from each authority.

== Campaigns ==
Paddle UK has been attempting for over fifty years to increase the extremely limited public access to English and Welsh rivers. In November of 2018, Paddle UK launched a Rivers Access Campaign - known as Clear Access, Clear Waters - which aims to raise public awareness of the problems that kayakers and canoeists face in accessing the rivers of England and Wales (the right to paddle on Scottish rivers is already written into the law). This campaign aims to bring about changes in the law for England and Wales similar to those now established in Scotland that will open up more rivers to the public.

Paddle UK's official charity partner is the Canoe Foundation.

== Controversies ==
In March 2025, Paddle UK suspended canoe slalom athlete Kurts Adams Rozentals from team GB. The athlete in question claimed that he was suspended for his participation in the OnlyFans platform, which in turn was used to fund his athletic career. The story was picked up by various news outlets including BBC News, ITV and Channel 4.
