= Canoe polo =

Team sport played in kayaks

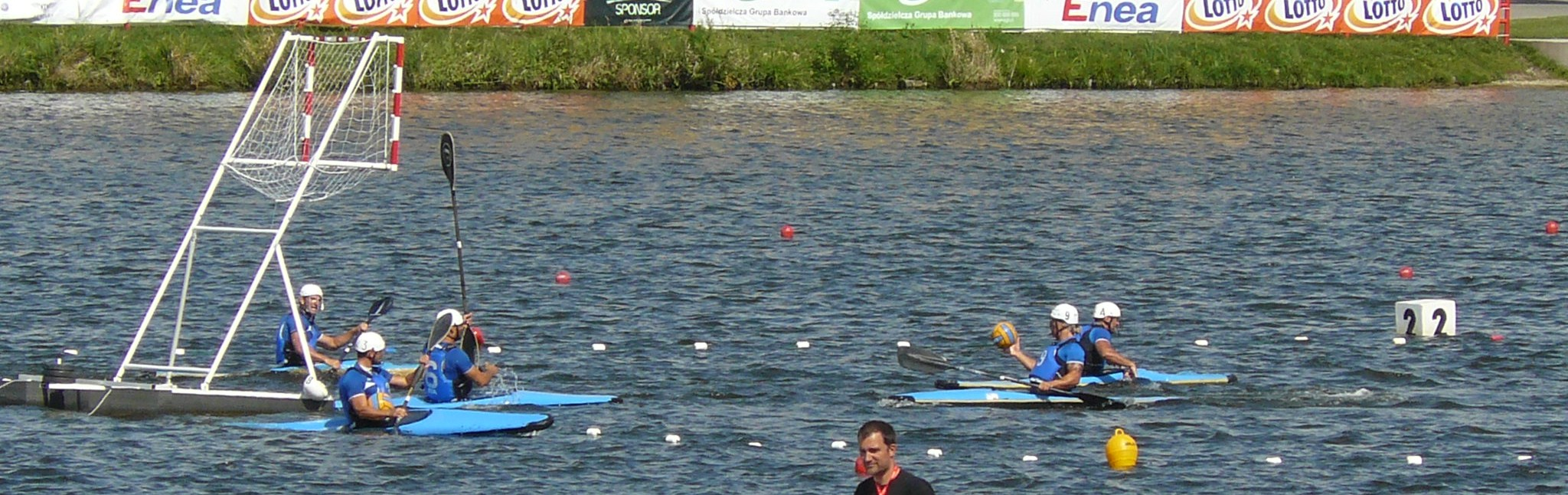
- Warm-up of the Italian national team during the European Canoe Polo Championship 2013
- Highest governing body: Paddle Worldwide
- Nicknames: Kayak polo, polo

Characteristics
- Type: Water
- Equipment: Water polo ball, buoyancy aid, helmet and face guard, goals, canoe polo kayak, paddle, spray deck

Presence
- Olympic: No
- World Games: 2005 – present

Canoe polo, also known as kayak polo or polo (to players and fans), is one of the competitive disciplines of kayaking. It incorporates ball-handling skills into a contact team game, wherein group tactics and positional play are as important as individual speed and fitness.

Each team has five players on the pitch (and up to three substitutes), who compete to score in their opponent's goal, which is suspended two meters above the water. The ball can be thrown by hand or flicked with the paddle to pass between players and shoot at the goal. Pitches can be set up in swimming pools or any stretch of flat water, which should measure 35 by 23 m (38 by 25 yd; 115 by 75 ft).

The kayaks are specifically designed for polo, faster and lighter than typical ones. The paddles are lighter and designed with pulling power and ball control in mind, with rounded blades for safety. Nose and tail boat bumpers, body protection, helmets and faceguards are required for safety.

== History ==
Canoe polo originated in the late 19th century in Great Britain, with Punch magazine publishing a picture entitled "Polo on the Sea" in 1875. The modern sport was born in the demonstration event held at the National Canoe Exhibition in the Crystal Palace National Sports Centre of London in 1970.

In response to the interest created at the Crystal Palace event, the first National Canoe Polo subcommittee of the British Canoe Union was formed, and it was this committee that developed the modern framework of the game. The National Championships were held every year at the National Canoe Exhibition, and this activity led to the inclusion of Canoe Polo in the demonstration games at Duisburg, Germany in 1987. The first European championships were held in 1993 in the United Kingdom.

In India, Canoe Polo was initiated by the University of Kashmir, Srinagar in 2008 when the University Aquatics Coach Muhammad Yusuf conducted a promotional match between the University of Kashmir and Islamia College on the waters of Nigeen Lake in Srinagar. Later this event was included in the annual water sports calendar of the university. The J&K Water Sports Association is also promoting this sport in Jammu and Kashmir on a larger scale.

== World Ranking ==
The canoe polo world rankings use results from the previous world and continental championships.

== Features ==
The game is now played in many countries throughout all inhabited continents, for recreation and serious sport. The sport has World Championships every two years and European, Asian, African, and Pan American Continental Championships held every year in between World Championship years. Internationally the sport is organized by the Canoe Polo committee of the Paddle Worldwide, as one of the disciplines of the sport of canoeing.

The game is often described as a combination of water polo, basketball and kayaking. The tactics and playing of the game are not unlike basketball or water polo but with the added complexity of the boats, which can be used to tackle an opposition player in possession of the ball, or jostle for position within 6 meters of the goal.

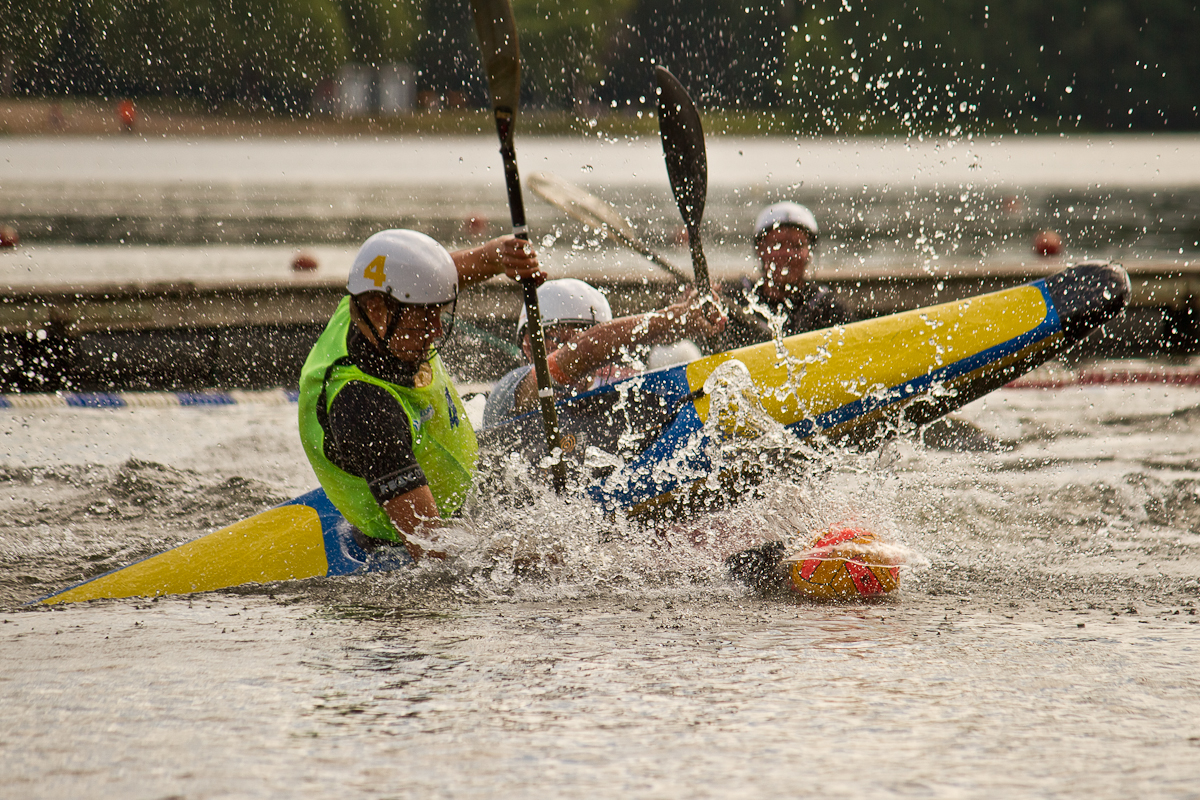
Finnish canoe polo championships, Lahti, Finland, 2010

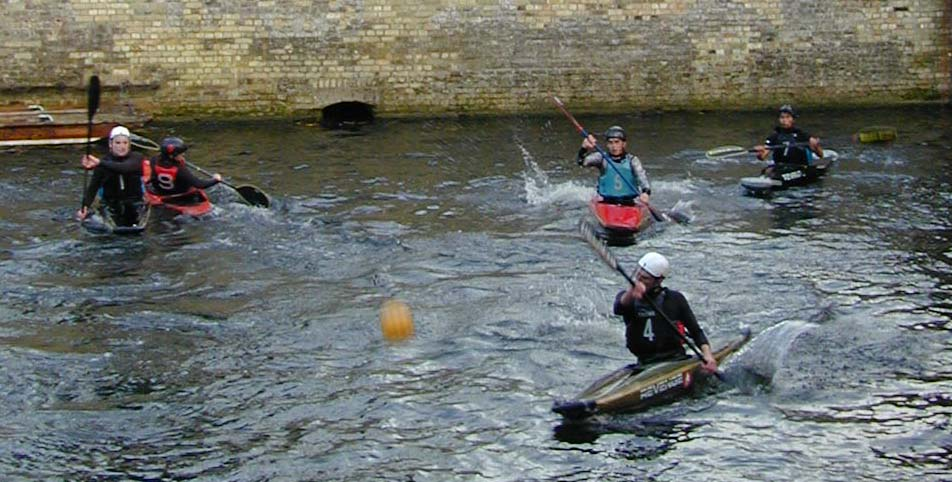
Practicing on the River Cam, England, 2004

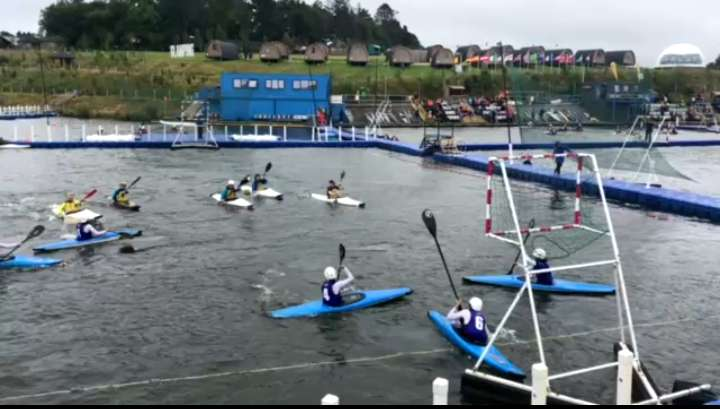
Junior World Championship, Belfast, 2022

=== Officials ===
There are two referees (one on each side-line) and they are on foot rather than in boats. The score is kept by the scorekeeper and the timekeeper monitors the playing time and sending-off times. The goal lines are monitored by two line judges. Before play commences scrutineers check all kit for compliance with regulations.

=== Pitch ===
Pitch

Canoe polo is played either indoors in swimming pools or outdoors on a pitch which should measure 35 meters by 23 meters. The boundaries of the pitch are ideally marked using floating ropes (similar to lane markers in swimming), although for smaller venues the edges of the pool are frequently used.

The area approximately 6 meters in front of each the goal can be defined as the Zone. This area is where defending players create formations to defend the goal from attackers.

=== Timing ===
The game is officially played as a 14- to 20-minute game consisting of two 7- to 10-minute halves. The teams change ends at the half-time period, which is 1 to 3 minutes long. Each half begins with a "sprint" where each team lines up against its goal-line and the ball is thrown into the middle of the pitch by the referee. One player from each team sprints to win possession of the ball.

=== Shot clock ===
A shot clock may be used to speed up the game. The attacking team have 60 seconds to have a shot on the goal or they lose possession. The shot clock is reset when the ball is intercepted by the opposing team or the attacking team loses possession. The shot clock is a recent addition to the rules, and due to the expense and complexity of the equipment is not used universally.

== Tactics ==
There are several attacking and defensive tactics all with different variations.

=== Offensive ===
- Overload: 1 or 2 players attack the side of the zone, pushing the defensive players together and creating space for a 3rd player to sprint into the newly created space, receive a pass from the 4th player and take a direct shot on the goal.
- Box player: A player positions themselves directly under the goal, next to the keeper. The aim is to keep this position and to receive a quick pass and then have a short, direct shot at the goal or pass to another player who takes the opportunity to break through the defence.
- Star: The players position themselves around the zone and sprint in consecutively, a defensive player moves to block each player as they sprint in, the attacking team move the ball around as the players sprint in, threatening to take a shot. If done correctly the fifth player is able to sprint into the zone, will have no defensive player to block them, receive the pass from the 4th player and be able to take a direct shot on goal.

=== Defensive ===
- 1–3–1: Three players form a row above the goal keeper, 1 to each side and 1 directly above the keeper. This formation can provide a very solid defensive line, by protecting the sides and the middle. The remaining player patrols the top of the zone with the aim of pressuring the ball and stopping players running into gaps in the defensive line.
- 1–2–2: Two players position themselves in front, and to the side of the goal keeper, and block attacking players threatening the goal from the side. The two other players go further forward and toward the middle with the aim of stopping players running in to the zone and to place pressure of the attackers. Looked on from above, it is not dissimilar to a Christmas tree formation. The aim is to force long-shots and errors from the attackers to win the ball back, while protecting the goal.
- Five out / Five Man Press: Every player, including the goal keeper, marks a player and pressures the ball and every pass, trying to force a mistake or gain an interception.

== Fouls ==
Most of the rules concern the safety of the players involved or are designed to keep the game fast-paced and exciting to play and watch.

- Illegal substitution and entry into the playing area: Only 5 players are allowed in the playing area at once. During a substitution a player must be completely off the pitch (including all kit) before another player can come on.
- Illegal possession: A player must dispose of the ball within five (5) seconds of gaining possession, either by passing it to another player or by performing one throw causing the ball to travel by at least one metre measured horizontally from the point of release.
- Illegal hand tackle: Types of hand tackle include any hand-tackle where the tackled player does not have possession of the ball or is sharing possession of the ball with another player or any body-contact other than one open hand to the opponents' back, upper arm or side or any hand tackle which endangers the tackled player.
- Illegal kayak tackle: Any kayak-tackle that results in significant contact between the tackler's kayak and the head or body of an opposing player, or endangering a player, tackling a player not within 3 metres of the ball or who is not competing for the ball.
- Illegal use of the paddle: Playing, or attempting to play, the ball with a paddle when the ball is within arm's reach of an opponent, contacting an opponent's person or any use of a paddle that endangers a player.
- Illegal jostle: When a player is stationary or attempting to maintain a position and their body is moved by more than half a metre by sustained contact from an opponent's kayak or jostling the player behind the goal line.
- Illegal screen/obstruction: A player actively or deliberately impeding the progress of an opponent when neither player is within three metres of the ball or a player who is not competing for the ball who actively impedes the progress of an opponent who is competing for the ball on the water and not in the air.
- Illegal holding: A player gaining support or propulsion by placing their hand, arm, body or paddle on an opponent's kayak, or holding the opposing player or their equipment or using surrounding pitch equipment (goal, side-lines, pool wall), fending off an opponent.
- Unsporting behaviour: Players showing dissent, retaliation, foul or abusive language, delaying tactics, interference with opponents equipment, bouncing the ball out of play or any action that the referees consider detrimental to the game.

Three general principles can be applied when determining the severity of a foul.

Deliberate foul – A foul where no effort was made to avoid the illegal play. Any deliberate foul should receive a minimum of a green card- either immediately or at the next break in play if playing advantage.

Dangerous foul – Is significant contact with the opponent's arm, head or body that may result in personal injury and is illegal.

Significant contact – Any high impact or continuous contact, that may result in equipment damage or personal injury.

== Equipment ==
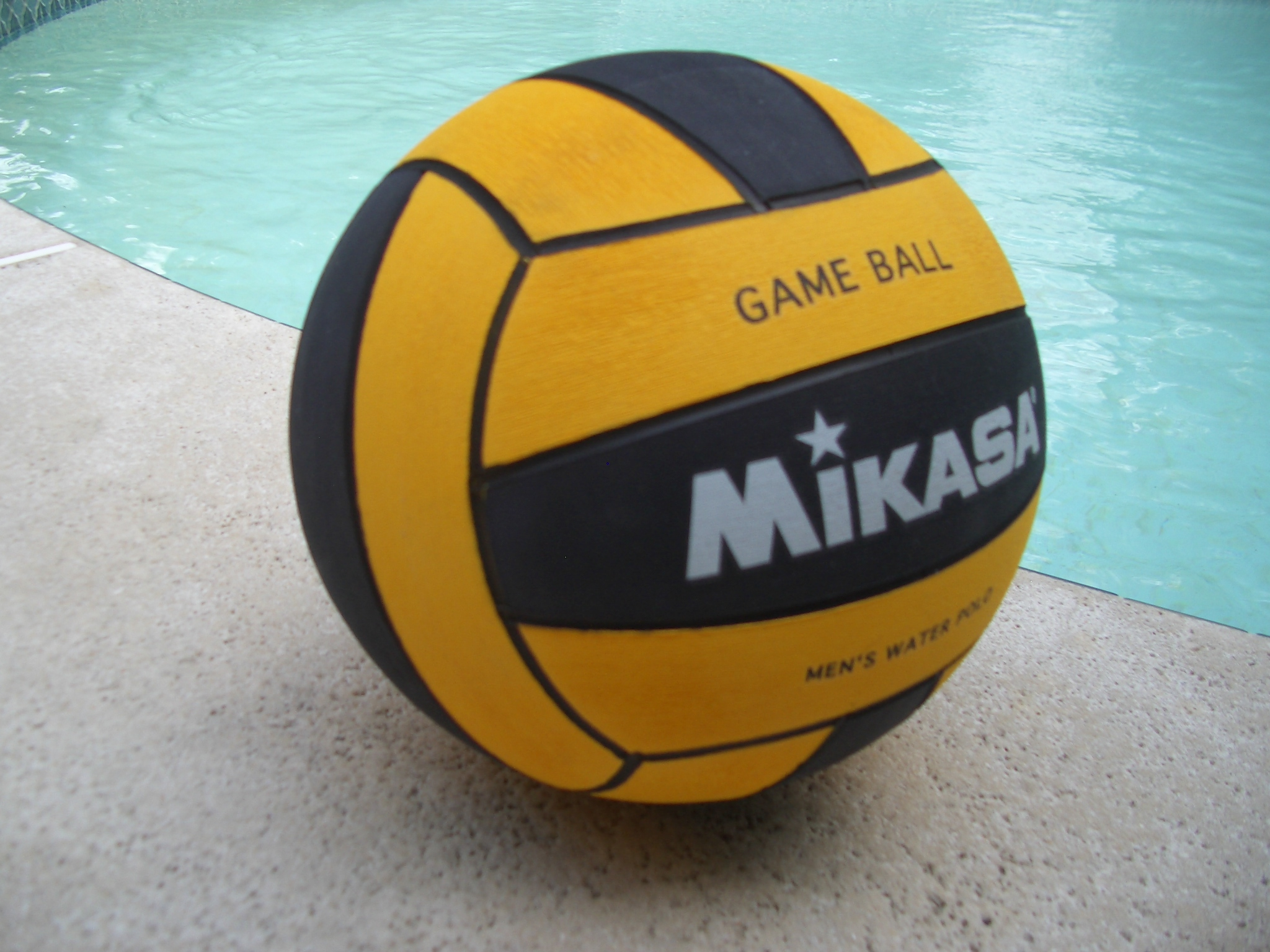
Water polo balls: old (left) and new designs.

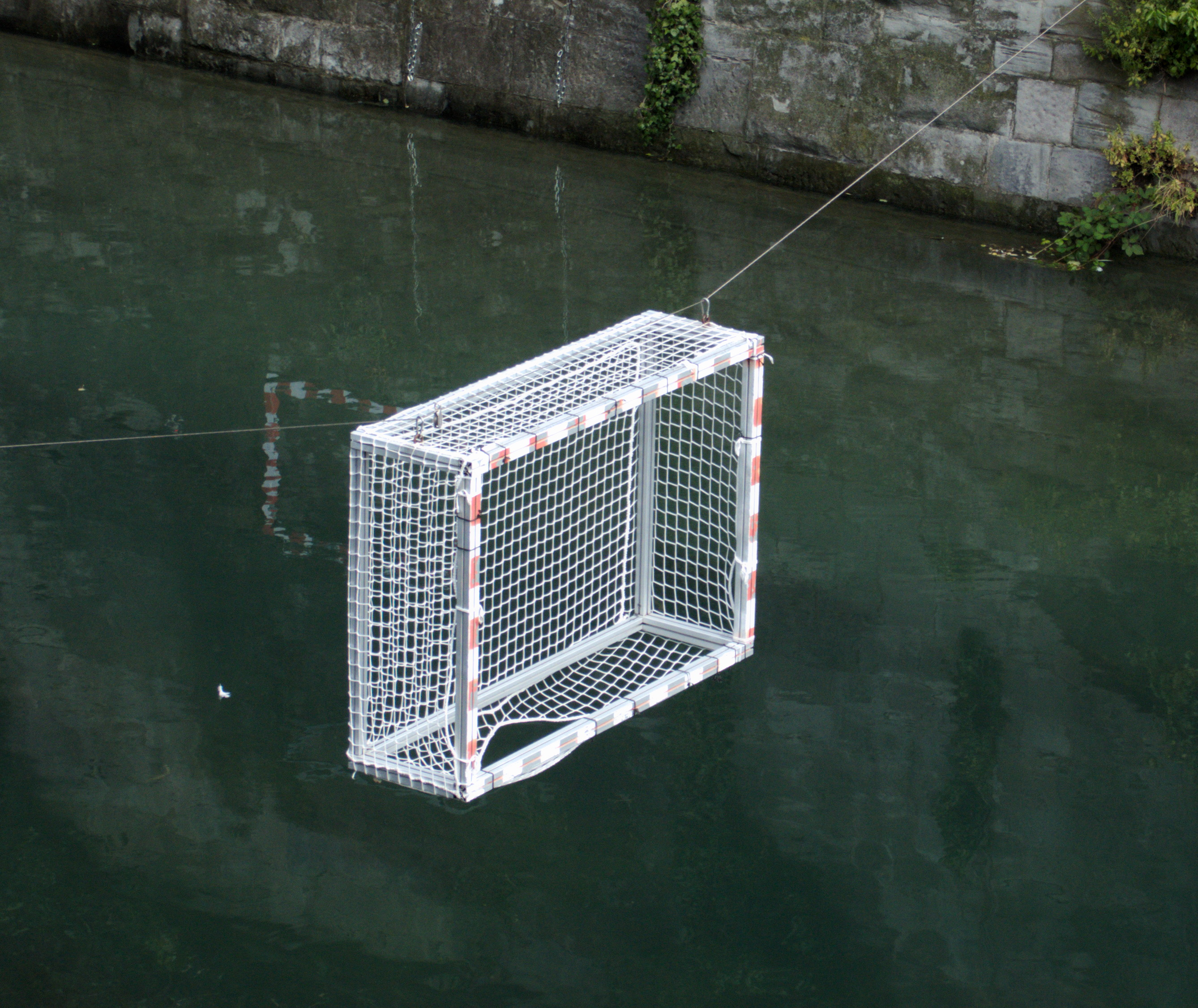
goalpost

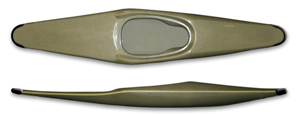
Canoe polo kayak

Specialized equipment is needed to play Canoe polo. Items required are:

- Ball: A water polo ball is constructed of buoyant material to enable it to float on the water. The cover is textured to give players additional grip. The size of the ball is different for men's, women's and junior games.
- Buoyancy aids: A buoyancy aid is used to protect the players' torso from injury, and must provide an inch of foam on the front, sides and back of the player. All buoyancy aids are numbered to make the player identifiable to the other players, referees and spectators. Buoyancy aids are reversible and are colored with the team's primary and secondary colors on each side. This allows opponents to reverse their buoyancy aids and play in their away colors if the opposing team's primary color is the same or similar.
- Helmet and face guard: Helmets and face-guards are compulsory to protect players head and face from injury caused by accidental contact from paddles or other kayaks.
- Goals: The goals (measuring 1 meter high by 1.5 meters wide) are a frame with a net, suspended 2 meters above the water. A player, acting as goal keeper, defends the goal with their paddle by sticking it up vertically. Special rules concern the goal keeper, such as: the attacking team not being allowed to interfere with or jostle them. The length of the paddles used by the goal keepers are often longer than those used by other players.
- Kayak: A special kayak is used. They are constructed from carbon-Kevlar or a similarly lightweight material. This makes them faster and more manoeuvrable than other kayaks. They are fitted with an inch of protective foam around both ends of the kayak to prevent injury and damage at high speeds.
- Paddle: A paddle is used to propel the players during the game. The paddle can be used to flick and play the ball. Paddles are strictly forbidden of being played within an arms reach of an opposing player to reduce the risk of injury.
- Spray deck: A spray deck is used to secure the cockpit of the kayak and prevent water filling the kayak during play.

== World Games results ==
=== Men ===
| Year | Host | Gold | Silver | Bronze |
|---|---|---|---|---|
| 2005 | Duisburg, Germany | Netherlands | Germany | United Kingdom |
| 2009 | (Chinese Taipei); Kaohsiung, Taiwan | France | Netherlands | Australia |
| 2013 | Cali, Colombia | Germany | France | Italy |
| 2017 | Wrocław, Poland | Germany | Italy | Spain |
| 2022 | Birmingham, United States | Germany | France | Spain |

=== Women ===
| Year | Host | Gold | Silver | Bronze |
|---|---|---|---|---|
| 2005 | Duisburg, Germany | Germany | United Kingdom | Japan |
| 2009 | (Chinese Taipei); Kaohsiung, Taiwan | United Kingdom | Germany | France |
| 2013 | Cali, Colombia | Germany | United Kingdom | France |
| 2017 | Wrocław, Poland | Germany | France | Italy |
| 2022 | Birmingham, United States | France | Germany | New Zealand |

== See also ==
- Paddle Worldwide
- British Canoe Union
