= Scamp =

Scamp may refer to:

== Computers and engineering ==
- National Semiconductor SC/MP (pronounced Scamp), an early 8 bit microprocessor
- Single-Channel Antijam Man-Portable Terminal, part of the Advanced Extremely High Frequency system
- Single-Chip A-series Mainframe Processor, a single-chip implementation of the Burroughs large systems computer architecture
- Special Computer APL Machine Portable, a prototype name for a single-user, portable computer concept made by IBM Research in 1973

== Military ==
- SS Sea Scamp, a 1943 Type C3 ship S-A2 troop transport in World War II
- SS-14 Scamp, the NATO reporting name for the RT-15 theatre ballistic missile of the Soviet Union
- USS Scamp, several ships
  - USS Scamp (SS-277), a Gato class submarine (1942–1945)
  - USS Scamp (SSN-588), a Skipjack class submarine (1961–1988)

== Transportation ==
- Aerosport Scamp, a small biplane designed for home building
- Clark Scamp, a simple, bicycle-based moped
- Honda Scamp, a.k.a. Honda N360, car made 1967–1970
- Mini Scamp, a kit car based on the Mini
- Plymouth Scamp (disambiguation), either of two small vehicles from Plymouth
- SCAMP (boat) or Small Craft Advisor Magazine Project, a wooden or fiberglass hulled sailing dinghy
- Scottish Aviation Scamp, prototype electric microcar produced by Scottish Aviation
- Southern Aeronautical Scamp, an American aircraft designed for home construction and Formula V Air Racing
- Supersonic Cruise and Maneuvering Program, the initial name for the General Dynamics F-16XL prototype aircraft

== Other uses ==
- The Scamp, a 1957 British drama film
- Scamp (comics), a Disney cartoon puppy from Lady and the Tramp
- Scamp grouper (Mycteroperca phenax), a grouper fish
- Colt SCAMP or small caliber machine pistol, conceived in 1969 as a replacement to the aging Colt M1911A1 pistol
- Supercritical Air Mobility Pack, breathing set in diving
- "Scamps", an episode of American TV series Adventure Time

== People with the surname ==
- Gilderoy Scamp (1812-1893), King of the Romani
- William Scamp (1801–1872), English architect and engineer
