= Kayaking =

Use of a kayak on water

A woman kayaking in a lagoon

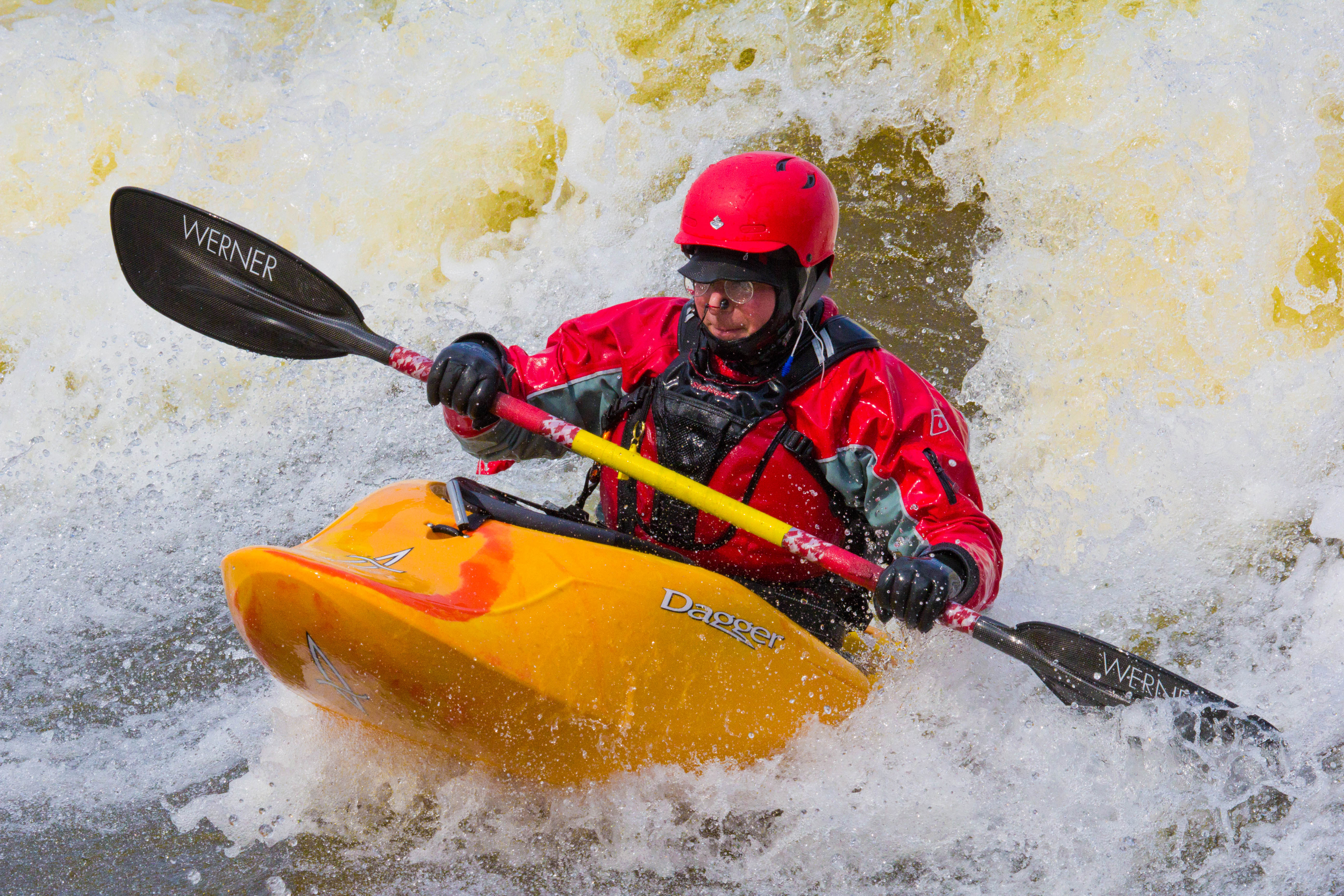
Kayaking in whitewater rapids

Kayaking is the use of a kayak for moving over water. It is distinguished from canoeing by the sitting position of the paddler and the number of blades on the paddle. A kayak is a low-to-the-water, canoe-like boat in which the paddler sits facing forward, legs in front, using a double-bladed paddle to pull front-to-back on one side and then the other in rotation. Most kayaks have closed decks, although sit-on-top and inflatable kayaks are growing in popularity as well.

== History ==
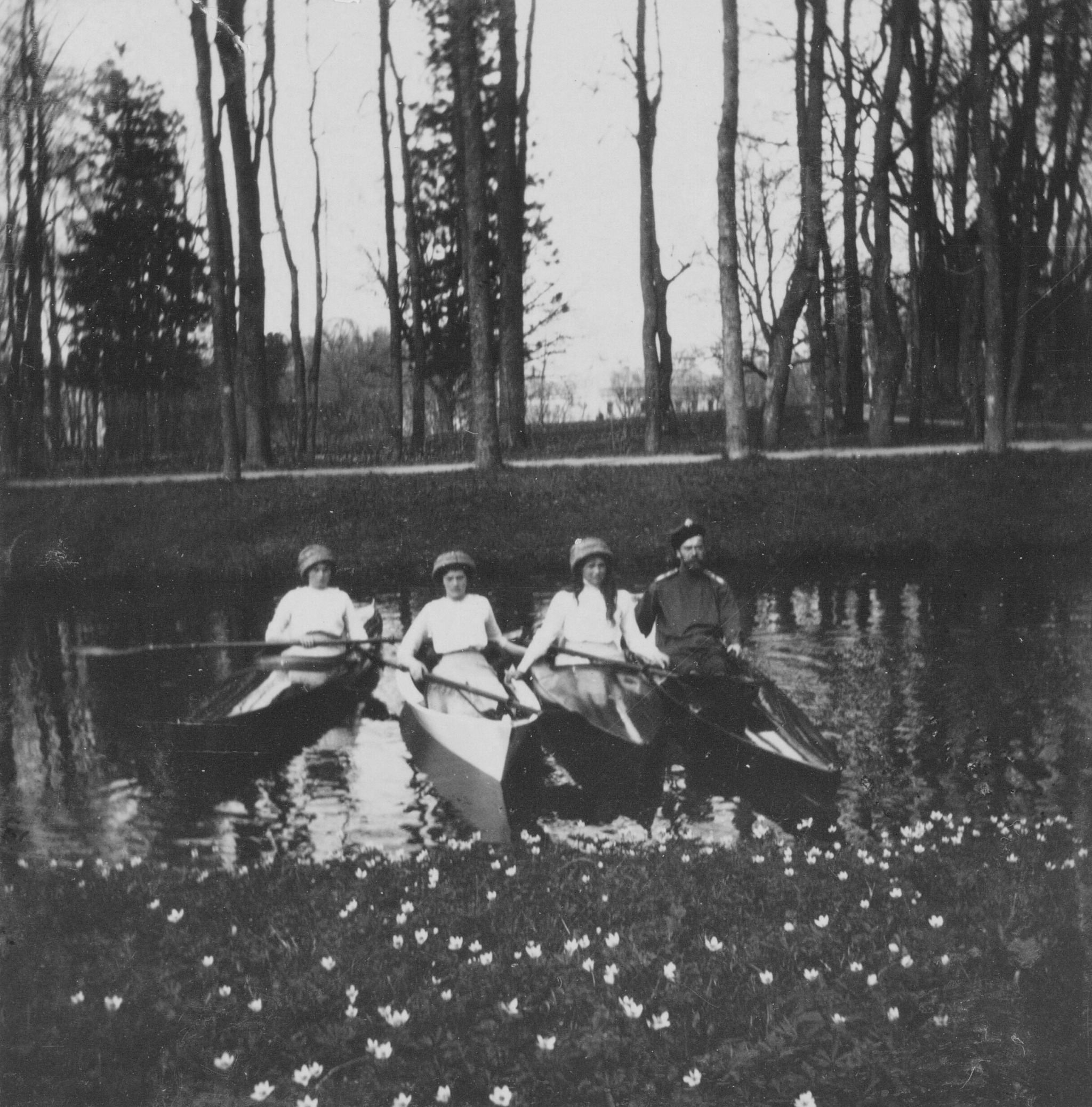
The tsar Nicholas II and three of his daughters canoeing and kayaking in the Alexander Park, May 1913.

Kayaks were created thousands of years ago by Inuit of the northern Arctic regions. They used driftwood and sometimes the skeleton of whales, to construct the frame of the kayak, and animal skin, particularly seal skin was used to create the body. The main purpose for creating the kayak, which literally translates to "hunter's boat" was for hunting and fishing. The kayak's stealth capabilities allowed for the hunter to sneak up behind animals on the shoreline and successfully catch their prey.

In the 1740s, Russian explorers led by the Danish-born Russian explorer Vitus Bering came in contact with the Aleutians, who had taken the basic kayak concept and developed multiple designs specifically for hunting, transportation, and environmental conditions. They soon recognized the Aleutians were very skillful at hunting sea otters by kayak. Because otters were a popular commodity in Europe and Asia, they would exploit and even kidnap Aleutians and keep them aboard their ships to work and hunt.

By the mid-1800s the kayak became increasingly popular and the Europeans became interested. German and French men began kayaking for sport. In 1931, Adolf Anderle was the first person to kayak down the Salzachöfen Gorge, which is believed to be the birthplace of modern-day white-water kayaking. In 1932, long-distance kayaker Fridel Meyer paddled from Bavaria to Westminster, England, and in 1933 she paddled from Westminster to Montrose, Scotland. Kayak races were introduced as an official medal sport at the 1936 Summer Olympics in Berlin, after being a demonstration sport at the 1924 games.

In the 1950s, fiberglass kayaks were developed and commonly used, until the 1980s when polyester and polyethylene plastic kayaks were introduced. Kayaking progressed as a fringe sport in the U.S. until the 1970s, when it became a mainstream popular sport. Now, more than 10 white water kayaking events are featured in the Olympics. While kayaking represents a key international watersport, few academic studies have (to date) been conducted on the role kayaking plays in the lives and activities of the public

== Design ==
Kayaks can also be classified by their design and the materials from which they are made. Each design has its specific advantages, including performance, maneuverability, stability, and paddling style. Kayaks can be made of metal, fiberglass, wood, plastic, fabrics, and inflatable fabrics such as PVC or rubber, and more recently expensive but feather-light carbon fiber. Each material also has its specific advantages, including strength, durability, portability, flexibility, resistance to ultraviolet, and storage requirements. For example, wooden kayaks can be created from kits or built by hand. Stitch and glue, plywood kayaks can be lighter than any other material except skin-on frame. Inflatable kayaks, made from lightweight fabric, can be deflated and easily transported and stored, and are considered to be remarkably tough and durable compared to some hard-sided boats.

== Equipment ==
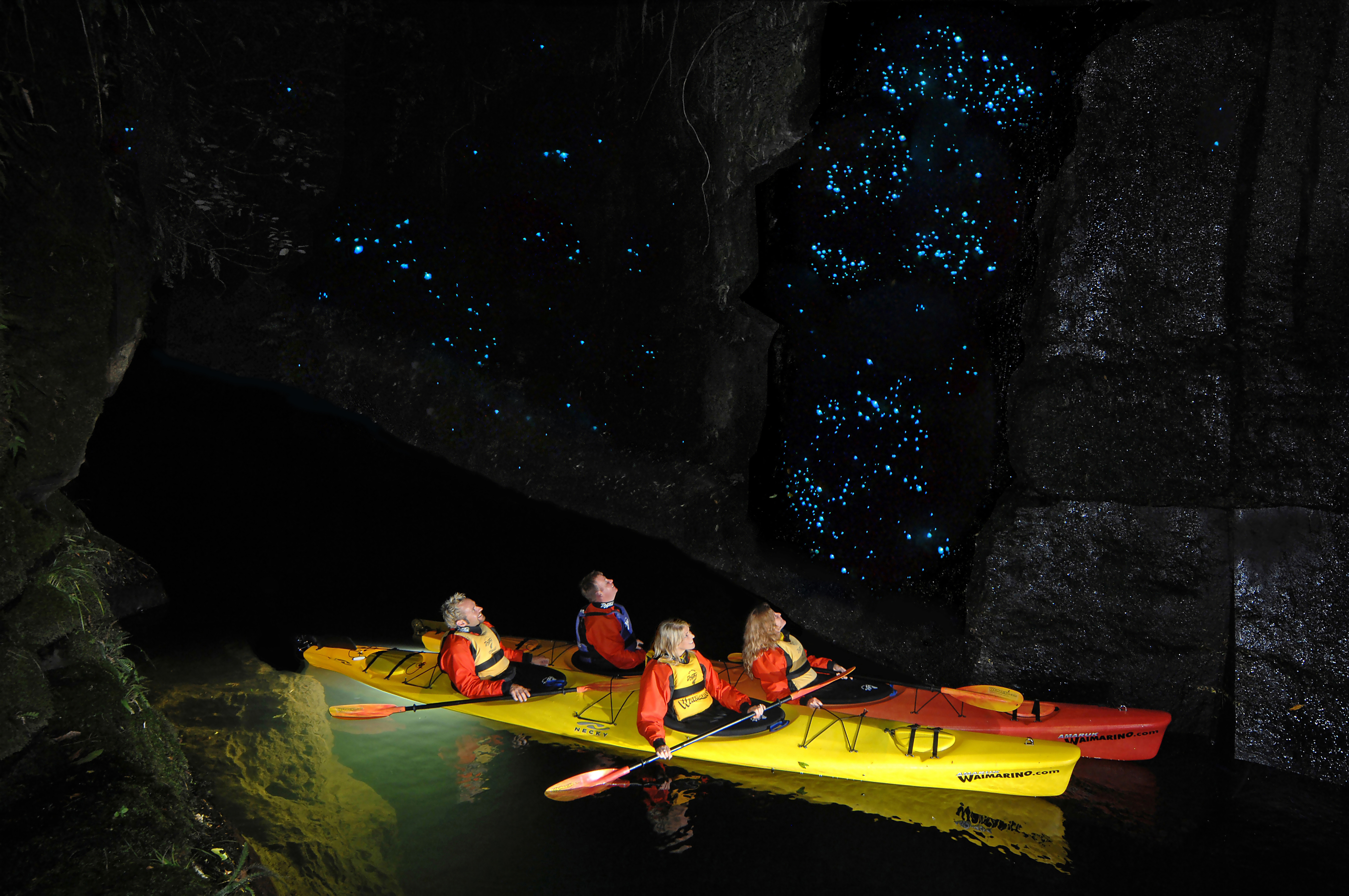
Glowworm Kayaking at Waimarino Adventure Park

There are many types of kayaks used in flat water and whitewater kayaking. The sizes and shapes vary drastically depending on what type of water to be paddled on and also what the paddler would like to do. The second set of essentials for kayaking is an off-set paddle where the paddle blades are tilted to help reduce wind resistance while the other blade is being used in the water. These vary in length and also shape depending on the intended use, the height of the paddler, and the paddler's preference. Kayaks should be equipped with one or more buoyancy aid (also called flotation) which creates air space that helps prevent a kayak from sinking when filled with water. A life jacket should be worn at all times (also called a personal flotation device or PFD), and a helmet is also often required for most kayaking and is mandatory for white water kayaking. Various other pieces of safety gear include a whistle for signaling for help; throwing ropes to help rescue other kayakers; and, a diving knife and appropriate water shoes should be used depending upon the risks the water and terrain pose. Proper clothing such as a dry suit, wetsuit or spray top also help protect kayakers from cold water or air temperatures.

=== Types of kayaks ===
"Sit on top" kayaks place the paddler in an open, shallowly concave deck above the water level. This style is usually used for non-white water activities as most find it harder to stay inside the kayak while also preventing them from "rolling" which allows the user to upright themselves if they flip over. There are some benefits to sit on tops such as the ability for a "dry hatch" these are a compartment, that usually runs the length of the kayak, which in addition to providing more buoyancy allows for the kayaker to store various equipment. "Sit on top" kayaks often use "through holes" which allows any water that got in the boat to make it through the deck and dry hatch to drain. "Cockpit style" involves sitting with the legs and hips inside the kayak hull with a spray deck or "spray skirt" that creates a water-resistant seal around the waist. There is a wide range of "cockpit style" boats which usually allow for more user control of the boat as they are able to push against the walls of the boat to tip in order to complete maneuvers. A common variant of "cockpit style" kayaks are "play boats" these are usually very short kayaks in which the user does tricks and maneuvers: "Inflatables" are a hybrid of the two previous configurations; these boats have an open deck, but the paddler sits below the level of the deck. These boats are often subject to more instability due to the way the boat sits higher in the water. They are often used in a more commercial setting, they are often affectionately called "Duckies". "Tandems" are configured for multiple paddlers, in contrast to the single person designs featured by most kayaks. Tandems can be used by two or even three paddlers.

== Activities ==
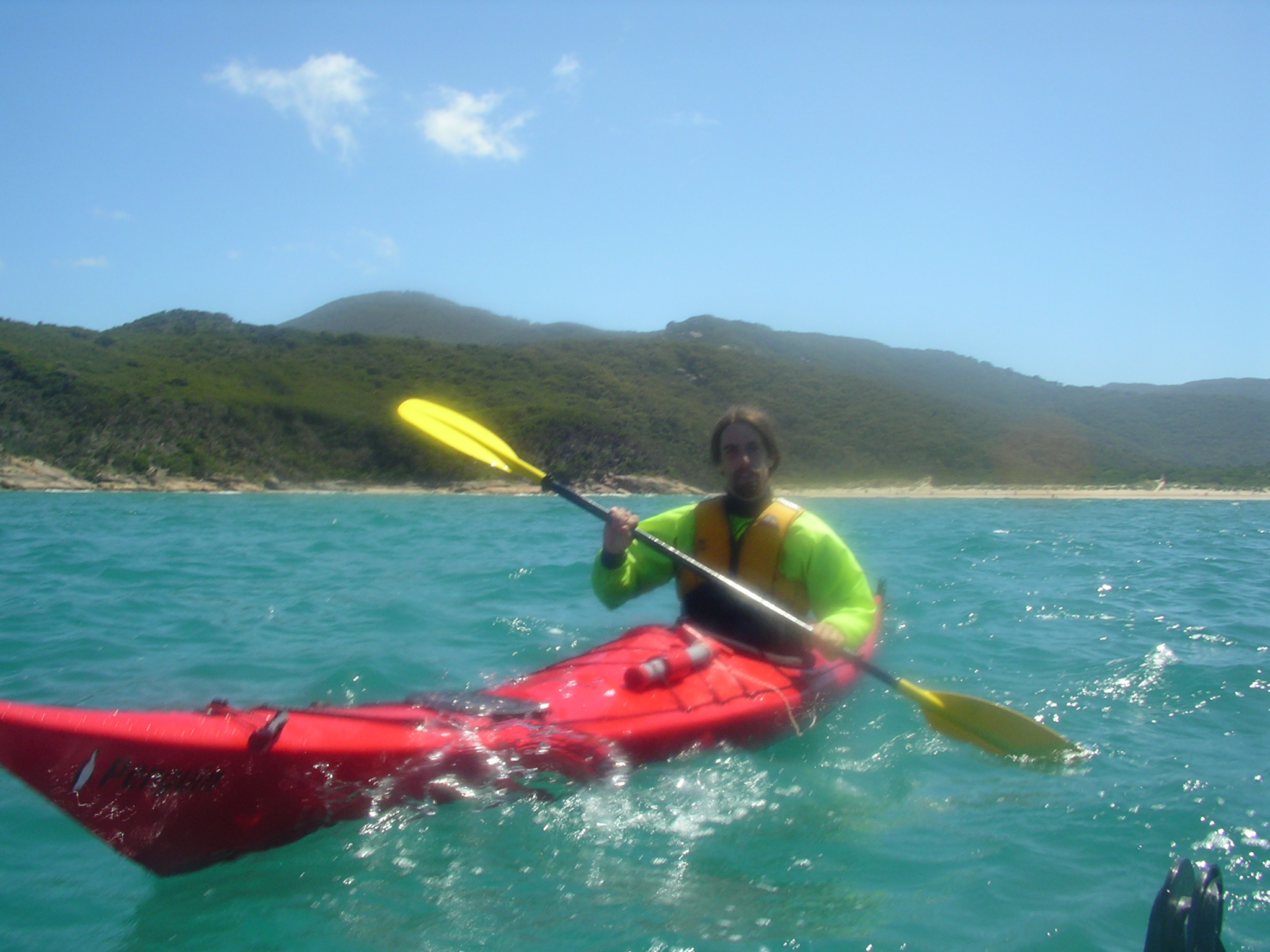
Sea kayaking at Wilson's Promontory in Victoria, Australia

Because of their range and adaptability, kayaks can be useful for other outdoor activities, in addition to paddling, such as diving, fishing, wilderness exploration and search and rescue during floods.

=== Paddling ===
The kayak provides a means to cross great distances, in both calm and rough water, with the coordinated usage of several muscle groups during several phases of the forward stroke. The different phases of the forward stroke are as follows:

1. The catch phase
2. The power phase
3. The exit phase

The Catch phase: The torso is rotated 45% towards one side of the kayak. At the same time, on the opposite side of the kayak, the paddle blade is planted in the water, down forward by the toes, with the paddle face completely submerged and facing the intended direction of travel.

The Power phase: The power stroke is initiated by unwinding the torso rotation (which was previously wound in the catch phase). As the core is the strongest group of muscles used in the paddle, it provides 60% of the energy of the power stroke. The upper hand on the paddle will assist with the torso rotation by pushing the paddle towards the direction of the stroke, while remaining at shoulder height. The lower hand can assist in the torso rotation by pulling on the paddle while remaining parallel to the side of the kayak. The arm motion is push>pull and provides 30% of the energy. While taking the stroke, extend the leg against the foot peg, on the same side as the stroke, which will provide 10% of the energy.

The exit phase: As the paddle reaches the hip flick it up to shoulder height. The paddle is lifted as it passes the hip. Paddling past the hip drags and lifts water and does not contribute to forward motion. Lifting the paddle rapidly contributes to rapidly performing the next catch phase.

=== Diving ===
Kayak diving is a type of recreational diving where the divers paddle to a diving site in a kayak carrying all their gear to the place they want to dive. The range can be up to several kilometres along the coastline from the launching point to a place where access would be difficult from the shore, although the sea is sheltered. It is a considerably cheaper alternative to using a powered boat, as well as combining the experience of sea kayaking at the same time. Kayak diving gives the diver independence from dive boat operators, while allowing dives at sites which are too far to comfortably swim, but are sufficiently sheltered.

=== Fishing ===
Kayak fishing is fishing from a kayak, long a means of transportation and stealthily approaching easily spooked fish, such as cobia and flounder. Kayak fishing has gained popularity in recent times due to its broad appeal as an environmentally friendly and healthy method of transportation, as well as its relatively low cost of entry compared to motorized boats. In addition, kayaks allow greater access by their ability to operate in shallow water, getting in and out along the shoreline, and having the ability to get away from the crowds to find a more solitary environment where boats may not have the ability to do so.

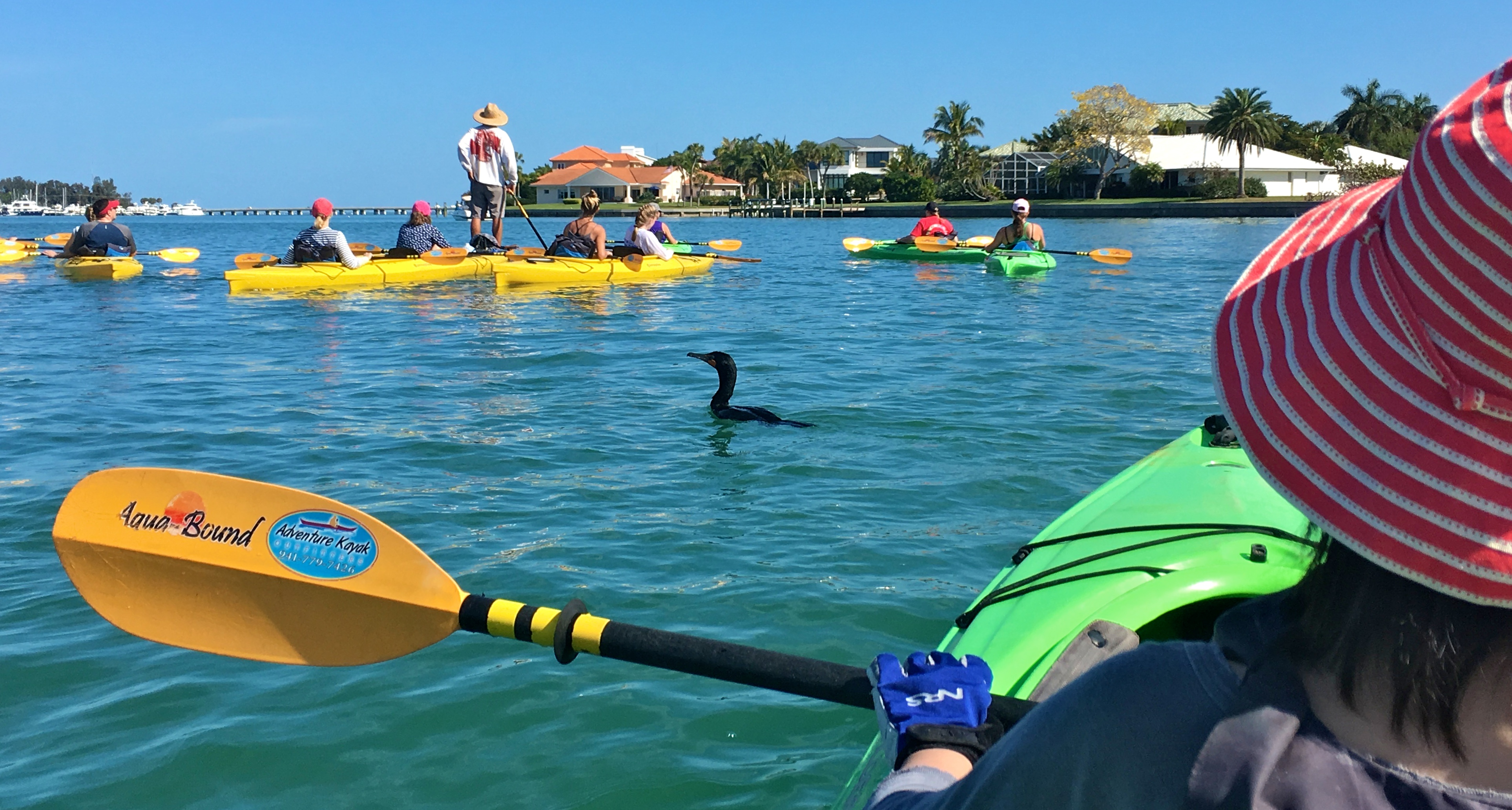
Ecotour guide stands on a kayak, spotting dolphins and manatees around Lido Key.

=== Ecotourism ===
Ecotourism based on kayak trips is gaining in popularity. In warm-water vacation destinations such as Sarasota Keys, guided kayak trips take kayakers on a tour of the local ecosystem. Kayakers can watch dolphins breach and manatees eat seagrass, in shallow bay water.

=== Whitewater ===
One of the most common uses of kayaks for hobbyists is whitewater kayaking. Whitewater kayaking is when a kayaker traverses down a series of rapids. The difficulty of these rapid ranges from Class I to Class VI. The difficulty of rapids often changes with water level and debris in the river. Debris that inhibits a kayaker's path are often called "strainers" as they "strain" out the kayakers like a colander. There are often training camps as well as man-made structures to help train kayakers.

=== Surf ski ===
A surfski (or: "surf ski", "surf-ski") is generally the longest of all kayaks and is a performance oriented kayak designed for speed on open water, most commonly the ocean, although it is well suited to all bodies of water and recreational paddling.

=== Winter kayaking ===
Winter kayaking is inherently more dangerous than regular paddling, as cold water and air temperatures can quickly lead to hypothermia. The activity requires the use of clothing that negates the effects of the elements on the kayaker.

== See also ==
- Canoe polo
- Canoe slalom
- Canoeing
- Paddleboarding
- Quadrathlon
- Surf kayaking
- Whitewater kayaking
