= Freya Hoffmeister =

German business owner and athlete (born 1964)

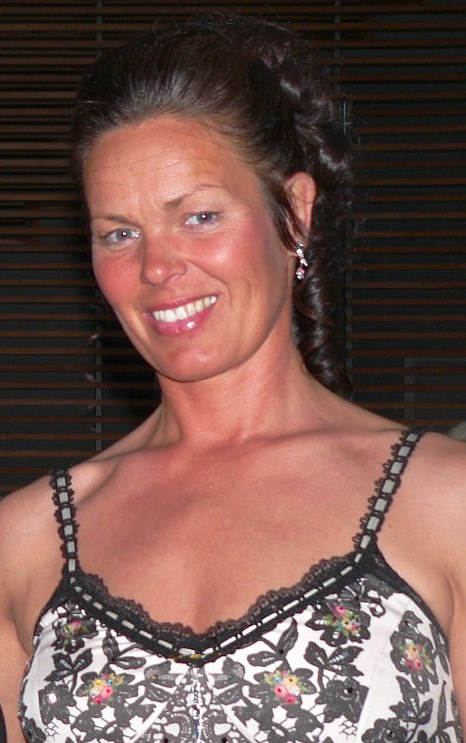
- Freya Hoffmeister, 2010

Personal information
- Nickname: The Woman In Black
- Nationality: German
- Born: 10 May 1964 (age 62) Heikendorf, Germany
- Height: 5 ft 10 in (1.78 m)
- Website: freyahoffmeister.com

Sport
- Country: Germany
- Sport: Sea kayak

Freya Hoffmeister (born 10 May 1964) is a German business owner and athlete who holds several sea kayaking endurance records. In 2009 she completed a circumnavigation of Australia solo and unassisted, becoming the first woman and only the second person to do so. Freya holds the fastest record for completing this trip On 3 May 2015, she became the first person to solo circumnavigate the continent of South America.

== Personal ==
Hoffmeister has been athletic from a young age, able to walk on her hands around her family home at the age of six. She competed as a gymnast, but grew too tall for the sport at age sixteen. She shifted to skeet shooting, and at twenty-three took up skydiving, completing 1,500 jumps, including the first-ever tandem jump onto the North Pole. She is also former Miss Germany beauty contestant, coming in sixth in the competition.

Hoffmeister owns a chain of seven franchise ice cream cafes, a salad bistro and a Christmas shop.

== Iceland circumnavigation ==
In 2007 Freya and Greg Stamer completed the fastest-ever sea kayak circumnavigation of Iceland in 33 days.

== New Zealand circumnavigation ==
She finished a solo unassisted circumnavigation of the South Island of New Zealand in January 2008, becoming the third person in 30 years to do so, competing with Barbro "Babs" Lindman of Sweden and Justine Curgenven of Wales to be the first woman to do so. She set the fastest solo time for the 2,700 kilometres (1,700 mi) voyage in 70 days, 6 days faster than the previous record set by Paul Caffyn.

== Australia circumnavigation ==
Hoffmeister's Australian trip commenced from Queenscliff, Victoria on 18 January 2009. She paddled in an anti-clockwise direction along the Australian mainland coastline and completed the 13,790 kilometres (8,570 mi) voyage in 322 days, of which 245 were paddling. Hoffmeister reached the approximate half-way mark at Broome, Western Australia in 171 days on 29 June 2009. and finished back at Queenscliff on 15 December 2009. To take a "shortcut", she paddled across the Gulf of Carpentaria from Jackson River to Nhulunbuy a distance of 575 kilometres (357 mi). The crossing took seven nights and eight days and required sleeping in the kayak at sea. This crossing was done only twice before, once by Eric Stiller and Tony Brown, chronicled in Stiller's book "Keep Australia on Your Left," and once by solo kayaker Andrew McAuley.

The only other person to have successfully completed the Australian circumnavigation previously is New Zealander, Paul Caffyn who took 361 days (257 of them paddling) in 1981–82. Hoffmeister completed the journey 28 days faster. She had to deal with "salt water crocodiles, sharks, sea snakes and deadly jellyfish" on her journey, and "at one point a shark bit the stern, leaving two holes in the side of the kayak".

Journalist Joe Glickman has documented Hoffmeister's Australian journey in his book Fearless: One Woman, One Kayak, One Continent which was released on 24 January 2012.

== South America circumnavigation ==
On 30 August 2011 she began her circumnavigation of South America from the Quilmes Yachtclub in Buenos Aires. She paddled south down the coast, rounded the Cape south of Tierra del Fuego, ended the first leg of her 8,000 kilometres (5,000 mi) trip in Valparaíso, the main harbor just off Santiago de Chile eight months later. She returned home for four months, resuming the trip in September 2012, paddling north past Peru and Ecuador, cross the equator and past Colombia and paddled through the Panama Canal then south past Venezuela, ending the second 8,000 km leg in Georgetown, Guyana. After another break, she began the third 8,000 km leg in September 2013, taking her past Suriname, Brazil and Uruguay returning to Buenos Aires in time to celebrate her 50th birthday on 10 May 2014.

On 5 May 2012 – the 248th day of her trip – she completed the first leg of her circumnavigation, arriving in Valparaíso as planned. She had paddled a total of 7,676 kilometres (4,770 mi) on this leg where she successfully rounded Cape Horn.

Hoffmeister resumed her trip on 25 August 2012. She completed her expedition on 3 May 2015 and is reported to have said that "[she] is convinced no one ever will any time soon do this trip after her".
