= Sea kayak =

Light boat that is paddled

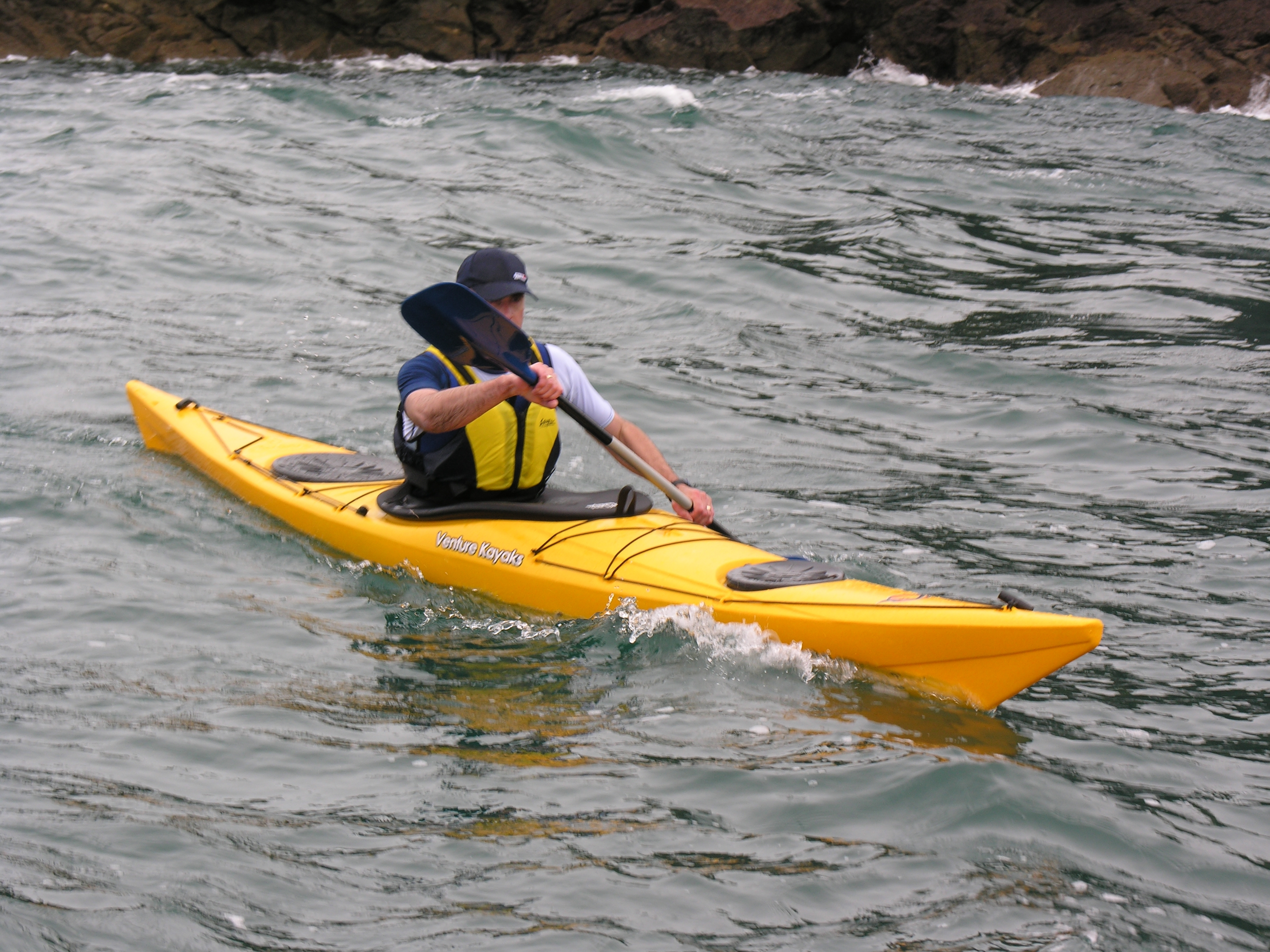
A modern sea kayak off west Wales

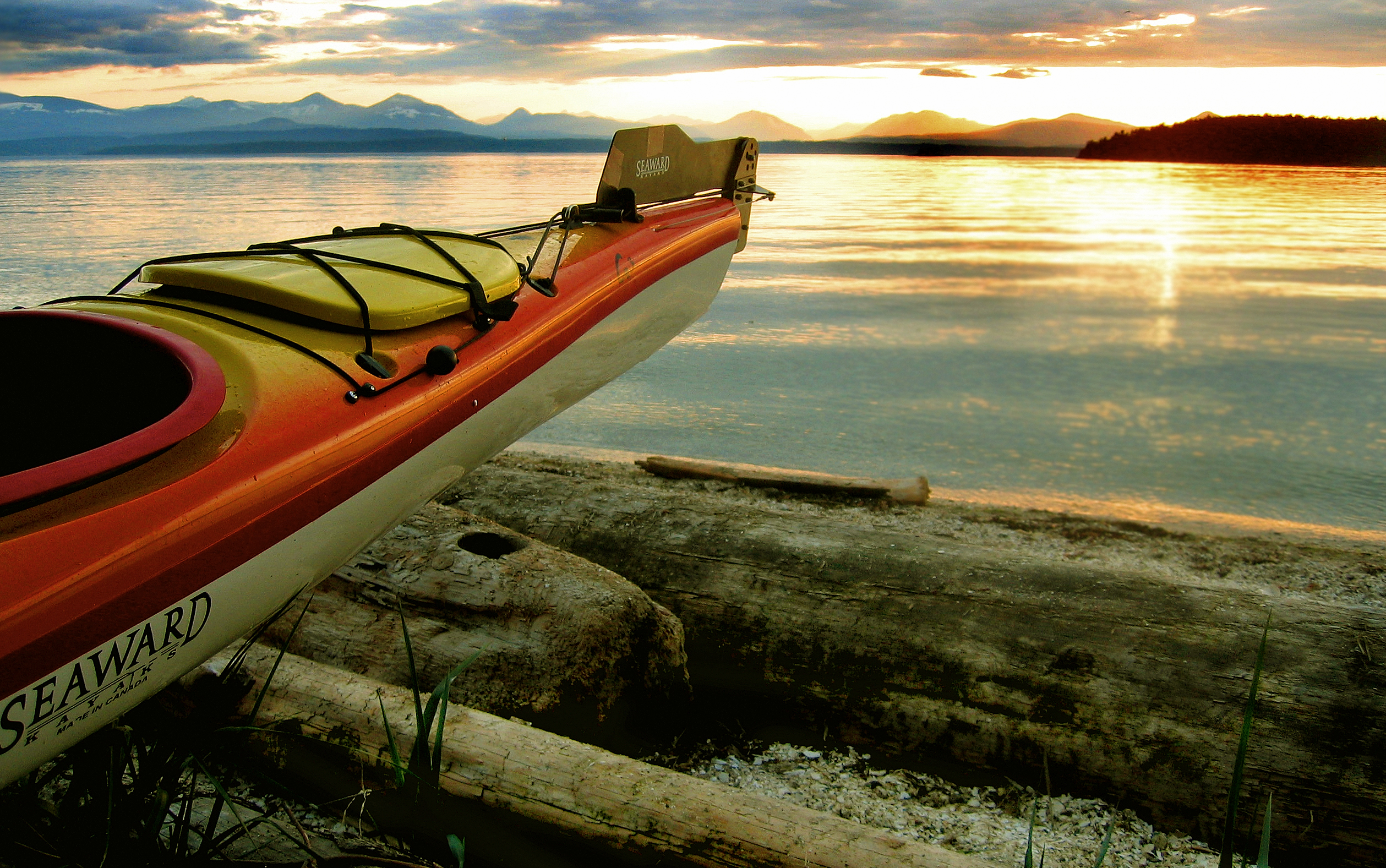
A sea kayak on Valdes Island, British Columbia, Canada

A sea kayak or touring kayak is a kayak designed for open waters on lakes, bays and oceans. They are seaworthy human-powered watercraft with a covered deck and the ability to incorporate a spray deck, and trade off the manoeuvrability of whitewater kayaks for higher cruising speed, cargo capacity, ease of straight-line paddling (tracking), and comfort for long journeys.

Sea kayaks are used around the world for marine (sea) journeys from a few hours to many weeks, and can accommodate one to three paddlers along with their camping gear, food, water, and other supplies. Solo sea kayaks are 3.0–5.5 m (10–18 ft) long, while tandem craft can be up to 8 m (26 ft) long; beam widths range from 53 cm (21 in) to 91 cm (36 in).

The term "sea kayaking" may have been popularised by the 1981 book Sea Kayaking by John Dowd, who said, "It wasn't called sea kayaking until my book came out; it was called kayak touring or sea canoeing or canoe touring, blue-water paddling, coastal paddling, all those things".

== Origins ==
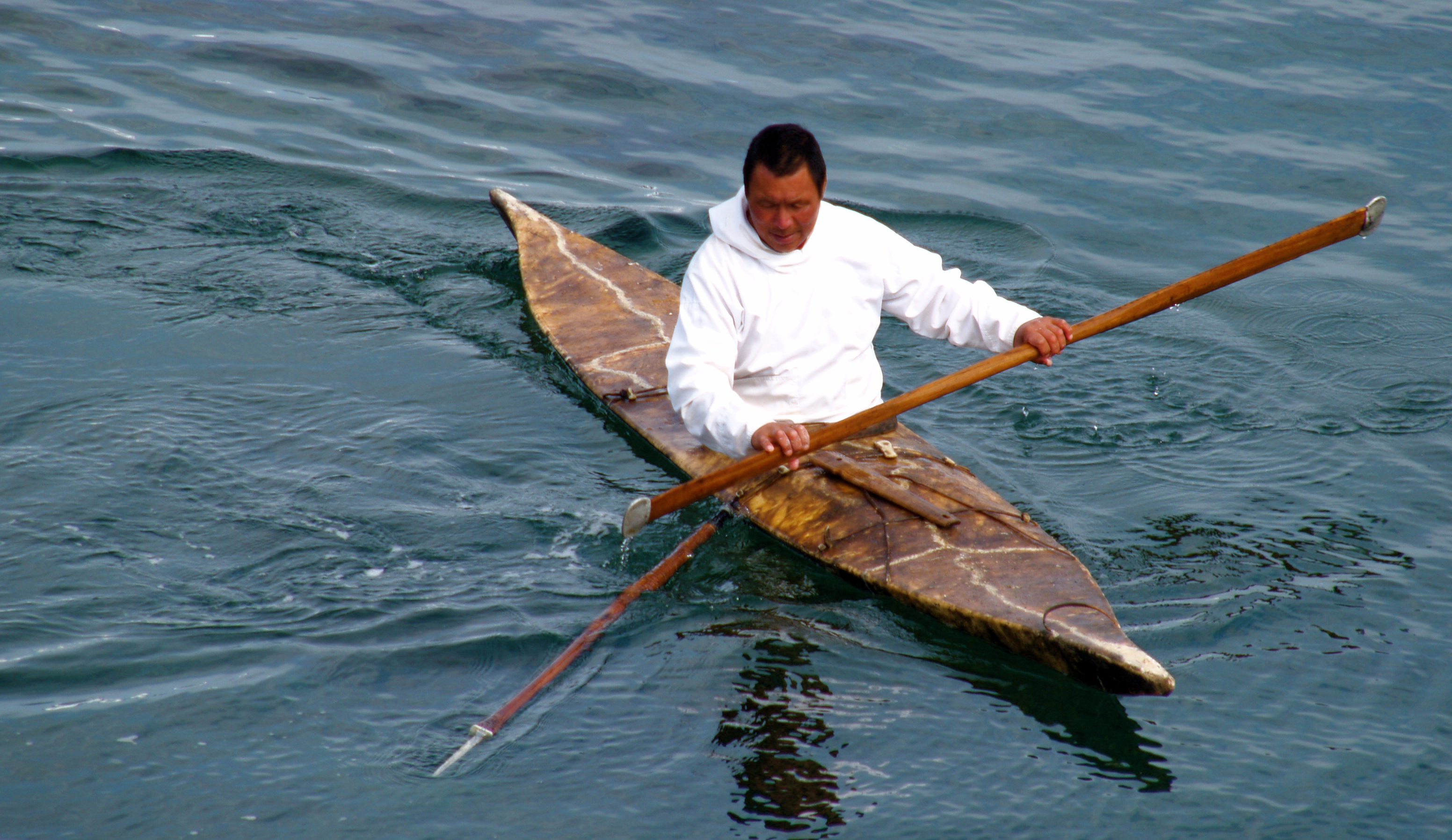
Inuk seal hunter in a kayak, armed with a harpoon

Contemporary sea kayaks trace their origin to the native boats of Alaska, northern Canada, and Southwest Greenland. Inuit (formerly Eskimo) hunters developed a fast seagoing craft to hunt seals and walrus. The ancient Aleut name for an Aleutian kayak is Iqyak, and earliest models were constructed from a light wooden frame (tied together with sinew or baleen) and covered with sea mammal (sea lion or seal) hides. Archaeologists have found evidence indicating that kayaks are at least 4000 years old. Wooden kayaks and fabric kayaks on wooden frames (such as the Klepper) dominated the market up until the 1950s, when fiberglass boats were introduced. Rotomolded plastic kayaks first appeared in 1984.

== Design ==
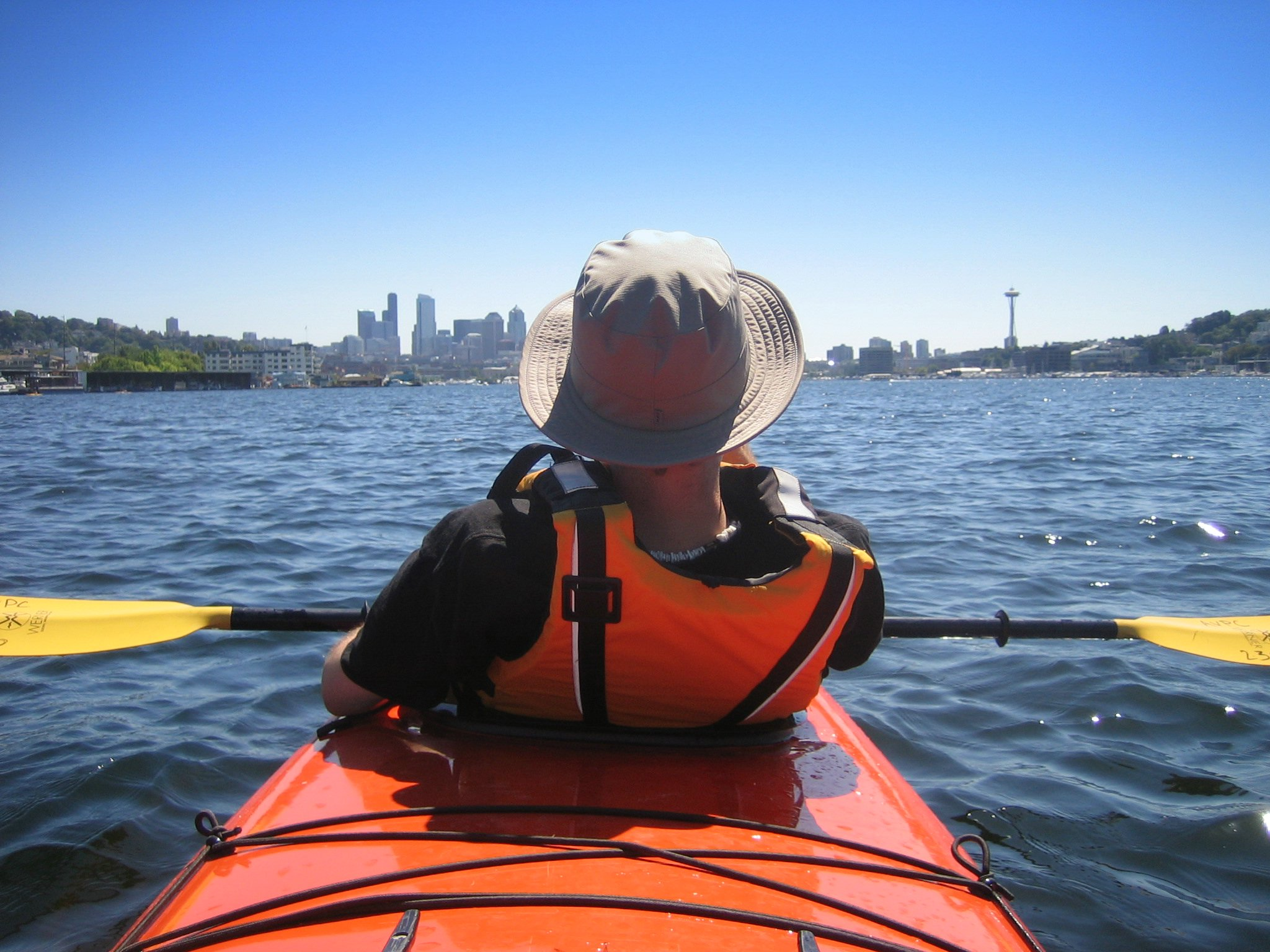
Kayaking in a double on Lake Union in Seattle, USA

Modern sea kayaks come in a wide array of materials, designs, and sizes to suit a variety of intended uses. In sea kayaking, where the designs continue along primarily traditional lines, the primary distinction is between rigid kayaks and Folding kayaks. Folding kayaks are in some ways more traditional boats, being similar in design to skin-on-frame kayaks used by native people. Modern folding kayaks use ash and birch or contemporary materials such as aluminum for the frame, and replace the sealskin covering with synthetic waterproof fabrics. Unlike rigid kayaks, folding kayaks can be easily disassembled and packed for transport. Many folding kayaks include inflatable sponsons that improve the secondary stability of the vessel, helping to prevent capsize. More recently, a class of inflatable folding kayaks has emerged, combining a more limited rigid frame with a tightly inflated skin to produce greater rigidity than an inflatable boat alone.

In recent years, there has been an increase in production of sit-on-top kayaks suitable for sea use.

Most rigid sea kayaks also derive from the external designs of native vessels, especially those from Greenland, but the strength of modern materials such as fiberglass, rotomolded plastic and carbon fiber eliminate the need for an internal frame, though significantly increasing weight. Modern skin-on-frame sea kayaks constructed with nylon skins represent an ultralight niche within the rigid sea kayak spectrum. Some recent design innovations include:

- Recreational kayaks – shorter kayaks with wide beams and large cockpits intended for sheltered waters
- Sit-on-top kayaks – boats without an enclosed cockpit, but with the basic hull shape of a kayak.
- Inflatable kayaks with either a removable bladder within a tough outer skin, or a single skin similar to that used in rigid inflatable boat (RIB) construction.

A different class of vessel emerged in the 1960s, the surf ski, a long, narrow boat with low inherent stability that is intended for use in surf and following waves.

=== Size ===
Most production sea kayaks are between 3.7 and 7.3 m (12 and 24 ft) in length, the larger kayaks often built for two (or in rare cases, three) paddlers. The width (beam) of typical kayaks varies from 46 to 81 cm (18 to 32 in), though specialized boats such as surf skis may be narrower. The length of a kayak affects not only its cargo capacity (for both gear and paddlers) but may also affect its "tracking" ability—the ease with which the boat travels in a straight line. While other design features also impact tracking, very long kayaks are easier to paddle straight (and harder to turn). The width of a kayak affects the cargo capacity, the maximum size of the cockpit (and thus the size of the paddler in that cockpit), and (to a degree that depends on the design of the hull) the stability.

=== Material ===
A sea kayak constructed from plywood, epoxy and fibreglass

Most rigid production kayaks are now made out of fiberglass, rotomolded polyethylene, thermoformed plastic, blow moulded polyethylene or carbon-kevlar. More exotic materials include carbon fiber and foam core. Some kayaks are hand-built from plywood or wood strips covered with fiberglass. Skin-on-frame kayaks are built on wood or aluminum frames covered in canvas, dacron, or other fabrics, and may include inflatable tubes called sponsons.

Marine grade plywood available today provides a high strength to weight ratio for kayak construction. Inflatable kayaks may be made from cheaper polyvinyl chloride (PVC) with a nylon outer skin to resist abrasion, or more expensive single-skin designs made from hypalon which is very tough and easy to dry after use.

=== Equipment ===
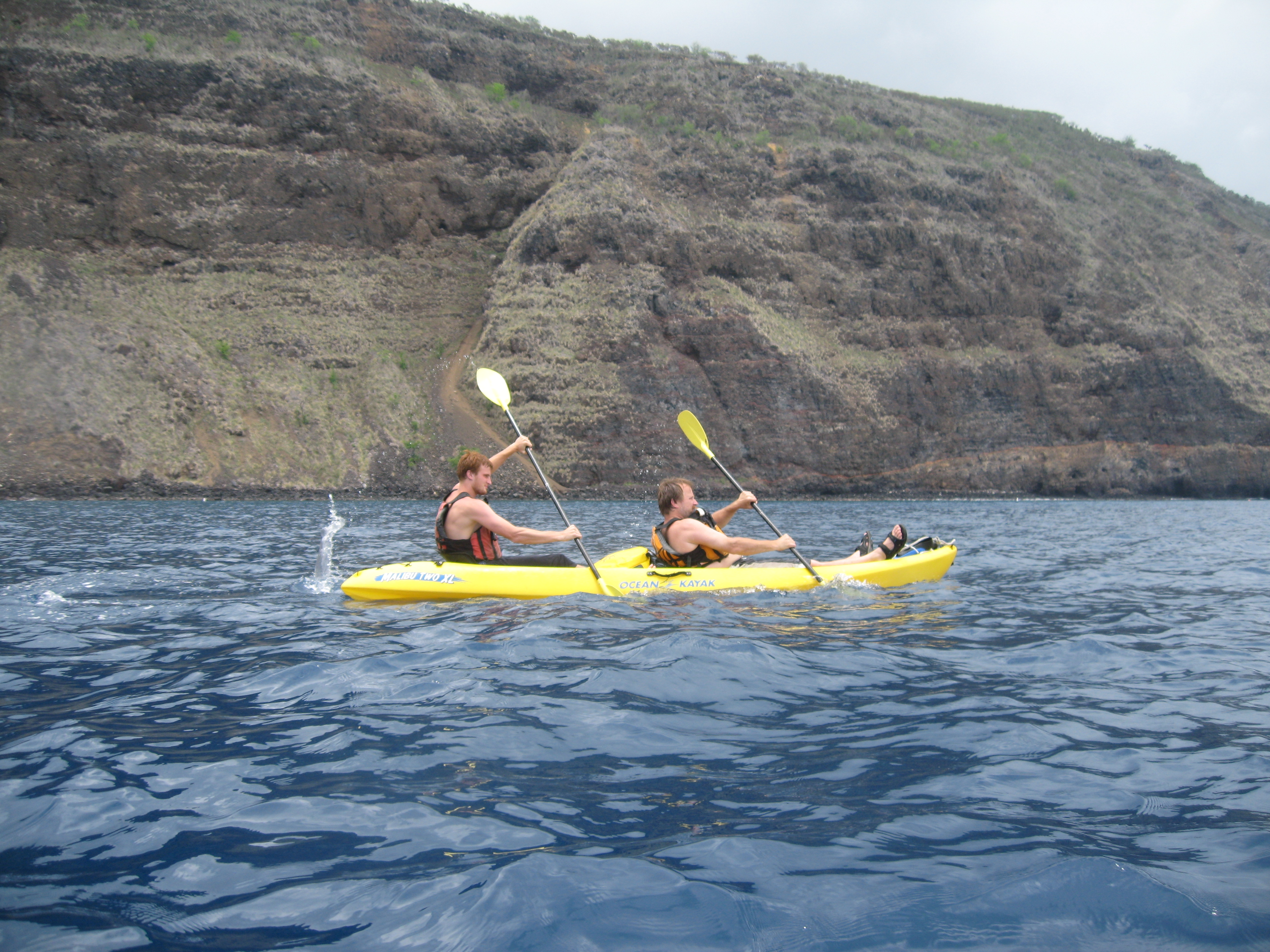
Sea kayaking is a popular way to explore Kealakekua Bay, Hawaii.

Sea kayaks have a wide range of hull designs, which greatly expands their range of performance. Designs can accommodate a wide range of physical fitness, or usage. Boats come in many lengths, whereby shorter boats are generally more maneuverable, and longer boats generally travel straighter and faster. Width of beam can affect a boat's stability, speed, and ability to bring to an edge. The amount of rocker (the curve from bow to stern) can greatly affect the ability of a boat to turn.

Many have steering gear or tracking aids in the form of rudders or skegs. In most cases, rudders are attached at the stern and operated by lines (wire or synthetics such as Spectra) from foot pedals in the cockpit. Rudders are typically retractable for beach landings. Skegs are typically retractable straight blades that drop from a well in the stern of the boat. Both devices assist in paddling when a strong wind or waves are coming from a direction other than directly in front. Some skegs may be more effective at countering pitch, roll and yaw.

== Forms of sea kayaking ==
Kayak Sailing on the Columbia River

=== Kayak sailing ===
Developed by kayak enthusiasts, Kayak sails can supplement or effectively eliminate the need for paddling. Using a sail can increase offshore range and allow longer expeditions. Use of a sail for touring has established a strong following with recreational sea kayakers, expedition paddlers, and adventure racers.

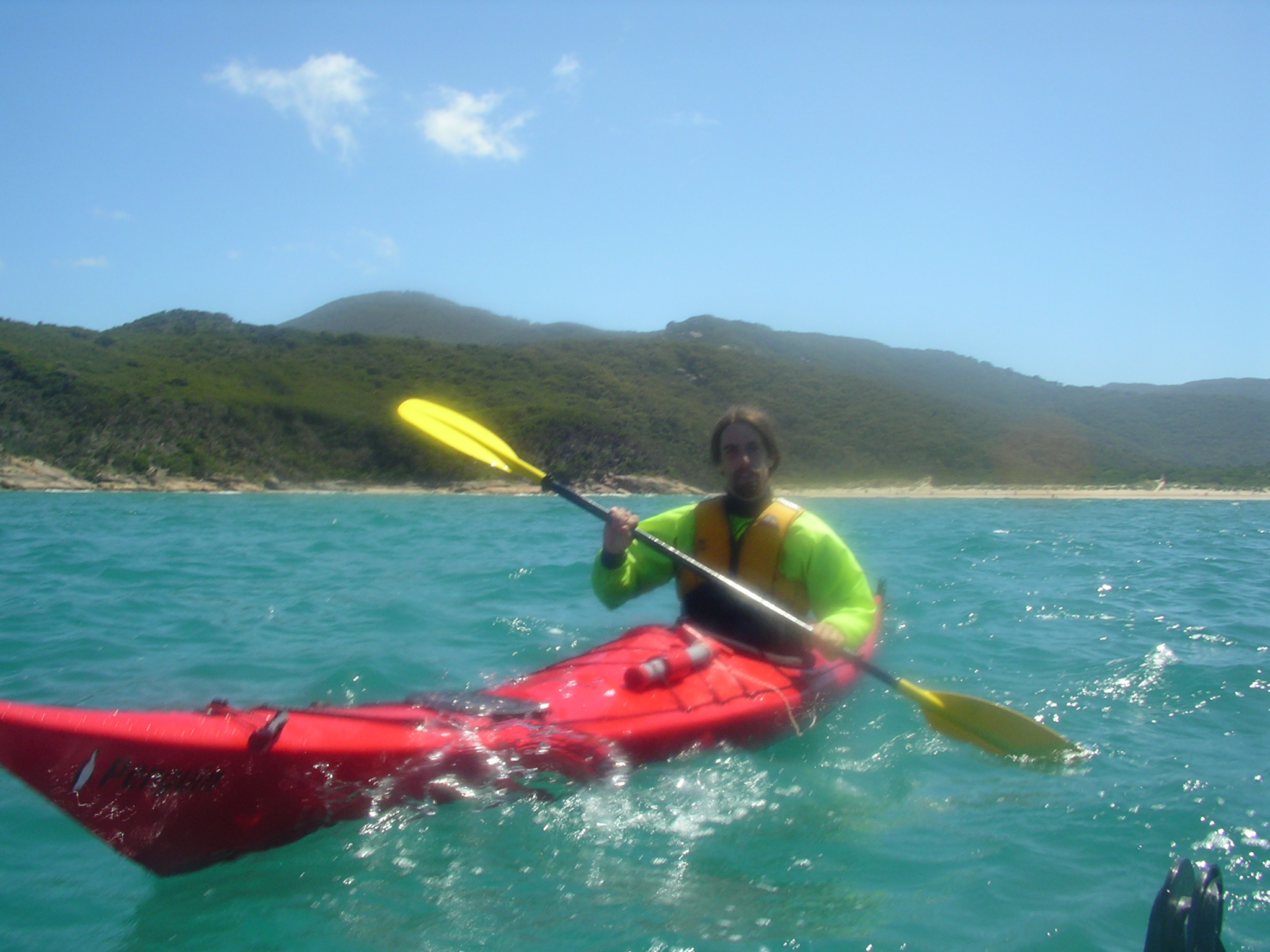
Sea Kayaking at Wilsons Promontory in Victoria, Australia

=== Expedition trips ===
Weekend trips with overnight camping are popular among recreational kayakers and many combine kayaking with wildlife watching. Modern sea kayaks are designed to carry large amounts of equipment and unsupported expeditions of two weeks or more are conducted in environments ranging from the tropics to the Arctic. Expedition kayaks are designed to handle best when loaded, so it may be necessary to ballast them on shorter trips.

=== Surf kayaking ===
Closely related to surf boards and requiring a mix of surfing and kayaking skills, a wide range of sea kayaks are specifically designed for the sport of surf kayaking.

=== Sea fishing ===
The sea kayak has long been a means of transportation and a means of accessing fishing grounds and kayak fishing has gained popularity due to the availability of purpose built stable designs. This technological development also solves some ergonomic problems that are associated with sitting for long hours without being able to change positions and special kayaks for fishing are accessorized for this sport, including specially designed hatches, built-in rod holders, catch bags and equipment mounts.

Many of the techniques used in kayak fishing are the same as those used on other fishing boats. The difference is in the set-up, how each piece of equipment is fitted to the kayak, and how each activity is carried out on such a small craft. Contemporary kayaks can be equipped with fishing aids such as rod holders, electronic fish-finders and live-bait containers. Kayak anglers target highly prized bottom feeders like halibut and cod and also pelagics like amberjacks, tuna, sailfish, wahoo, and even marlin.

== Pioneering expeditions ==
Pre-1900

- There is controversial evidence to suggest early trans-Atlantic kayak journeys from Labrador or Greenland to Scotland by Inuit paddlers. At the end of the 17th century there were at least three separate kayaks preserved in Scotland. One kayak, with associated equipment, is preserved in Aberdeen's Marischal Museum. It was found, with dying occupant, on a nearby shore. Some suggest the occupants were escaped Inuit from European ships, Inuit storm-driven from Greenland, or from a European source. Many suggest Inuit and their kayaks to be the origin of the Celtic Finn-men, or Selkie, legends.

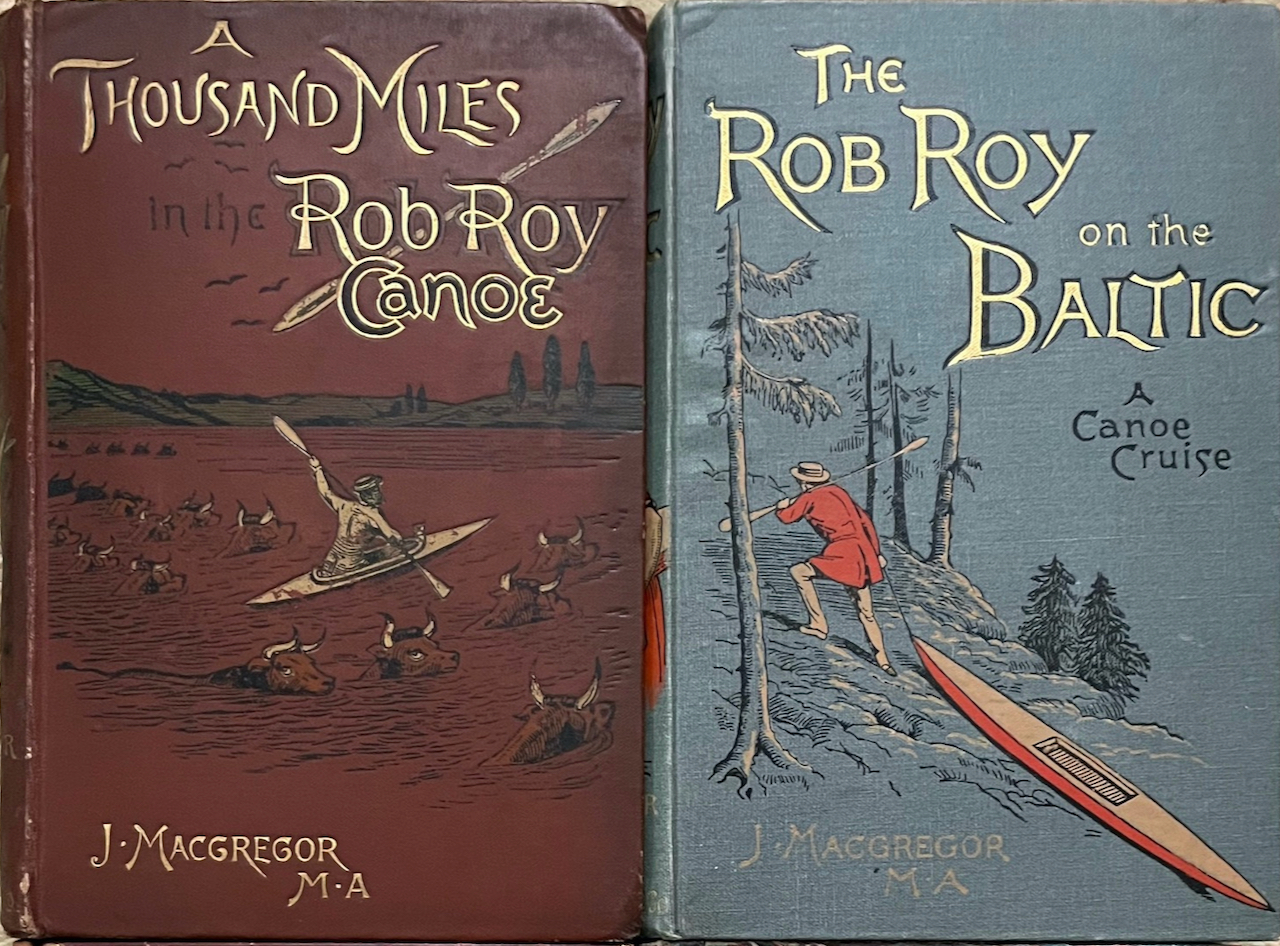
A Thousand Miles in the Rob Roy Canoe (1866); The Rob Roy on the Baltic (1867)

- Modern sea kayaking traces its origins back to John MacGregor (sportsman), credited with the development of the first sailing canoes and with popularizing canoeing as a sport in Europe and the United States. The boat he designed (named the Rob Roy) was inspired by the Northern American kayaks. From 1866 to 1869, MacGregor chronicled the first modern sea kayaking expeditions within three publications: A Thousand Miles in the Rob Roy Canoe (1866); The Rob Roy on the Baltic (1867); and The Rob Roy on the Jordan (1869).
- From 1874-1875, American explorer and writer Nathaniel Holmes Bishop paddled 2500 Miles from Quebec to the Gulf of Mexico in a self-designed canoe very similar to MacGregor's Rob Roy and the North American kayak. This journey was chronicled in his book Voyage of the Paper Canoe (1878).

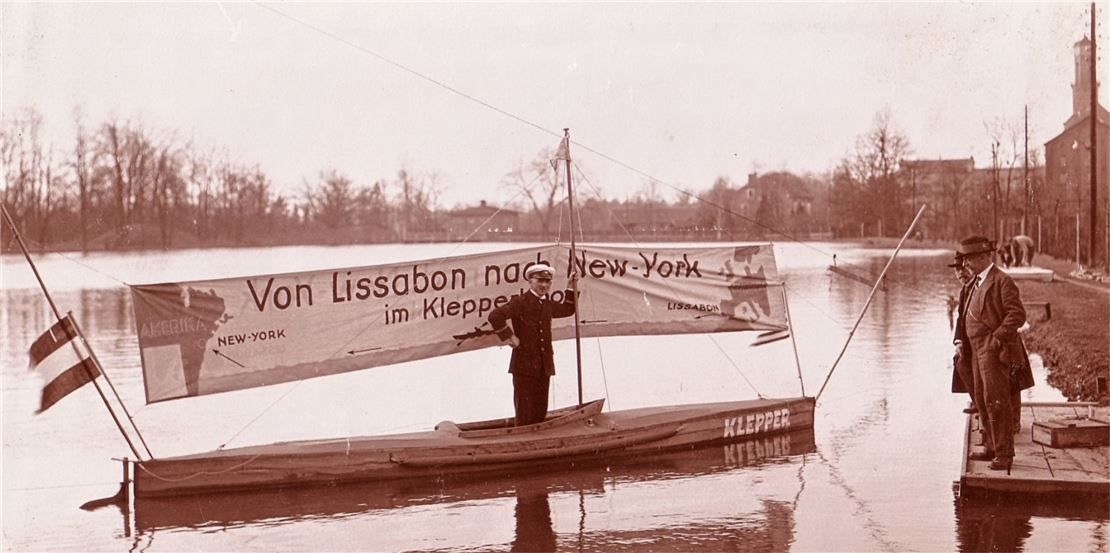
Franz Romer in his Klepper kayak

1920s

- Franz Romer crossed the Atlantic Ocean solo in a fabric skin-covered kayak in 1928. His crossing from the Canary Islands to Puerto Rico took 58 days at sea but he was lost in a hurricane trying to get to New York

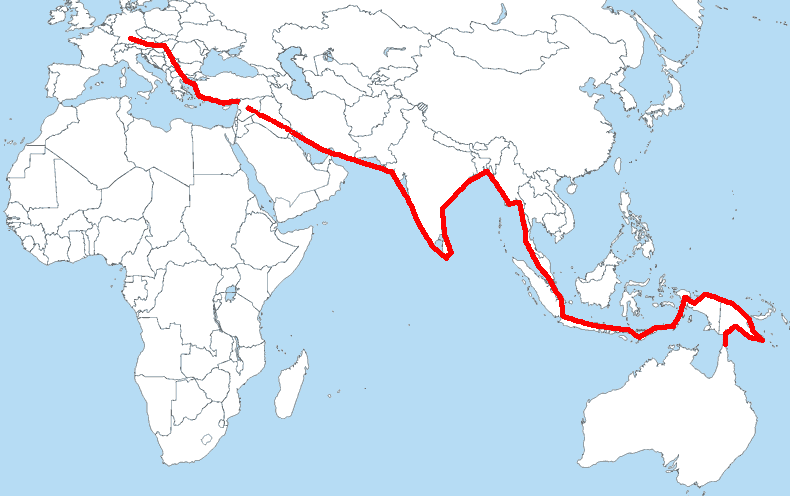
Map of Oskar Speck journey (1932-1939) from Germany to Australia

1930s

- Oskar Speck was a German canoeist who kayaked from Germany to Australia between 1932 and 1939. Speck paddled approximately 30,000 miles over seven years and four months.
- Alastair Dunnett and James Adam kayaked from Glasgow to Skye Scotland in 1934. Their journey is chronicled in the book Quest by Canoe: Glasgow to Skye (1950), republished in 1969 as It's Too Late in the Year, and again in 1995 as The Canoe Boys: From the Clyde Past the Cuillins.

1950s

- J. Lewis Henderson kayaked the Scottish coastline as documented in his book Kayak to Cape Wrath (1951).
- Hannes Lindemann sailed an Aerius II kayak across the Atlantic from the Canary Islands to the Caribbean in 1956. Documented in the book Alone at Sea.

1960s

- Anne and Hamish Gow made the first kayak crossing from North Uist to St Kilda, Scotland in 1965. The Gows took film footage of the trip which was screened at the Edinburgh Mountain Film Festival in 2011.
- John Dowd kayaked from the South China Sea to Indonesia in 1969.

1970s

- Derek Hutchinson was the first to cross the North Sea in 1976. After several near-death failures he finally managed it in 31 hours. The kayak used in the crossing is today located in the National Maritime Museum Cornwall.
- Nigel Foster and Geoff Hunter were the first to circumnavigate Iceland in 1977. Foster recounts this journey in his book Iceland by Kayak (2023)
- Frank Goodman was the first to circumnavigate Cape Horn in 1977.
- Paul Caffyn was the first person to circumnavigate the South Island of New Zealand in the summer of 1977/78. He describes it in his book Obscured by Waves.
- Paul Caffyn was the first person to circumnavigate the North Island of New Zealand in the summer of 1978/79. He describes it in his book Cresting the Restless Waves.
- Derek Hairon, Franco Ferrero and John Bouteloup were the first to circumnavigate Ireland in 1978
- Earle Bloomfield and John Brewster were the first to circumnavigate Tasmania in 1979.

1980s

- Paul Caffyn and Nigel Dennis were the first sea kayakers to circumnavigate Great Britain in 1980, a distance of 3,500 km (2,200 mi) in 85 days.
- Jim Breen, Gus Mathieson, Bill Turnbull and Peter Wilson completed the first circumnavigation of the Vesteralen and Lofoten Islands in Arctic Norway in 1980 including the dual crossing of the Maelstrom (Moskenstraumen) the largest whirlpool area in the world. The Scottish Maritime Museum in Irvine retains a kayak and range of equipment used.
- Nigel Foster paddled solo crossing Hudson Strait from Baffin Island to northern Labrador in 1981. Foster's book On Polar Tides (2016) recounts both his 1981 voyage and his 2004 return to the northern Labrador coast.
- Paul Caffyn was the first person to circumnavigate Australia in 1981/82 covering a distance of 15,160 km (9,420 mi). He describes it in his book The Dreamtime Voyage (1994).
- Laurie Ford paddled solo (sail assisted) across Bass Strait in 1982.
- David Taylor and James Moore were the first to circumnavigate The Faroe Islands in 1985.
- Brian Wilson rounded Scotland's main coastline (including the inner and outer Hebrides) on a solo trip lasting over 4 months in 1985. Described in his book Blazing Paddles (1989).
- Earle Bloomfield, Larry Gray, Rob Casamento, and Graeme Joy paddled northwards across Bass Strait in 1986. (Note that the northward crossing is more difficult than the southward.)
- Bill Taylor, Richard Elliott, and Mick Wibrew accomplished between April and September 1986 the first circumnavigation by kayak of both Britain and Ireland. Their journey is chronicled in the book Commitment and Open Crossings (1992) by Bill Taylor.
- Ed Gillet paddled for 63 days from San Diego, California, to Maui, Hawaii, on a 2,200 mile route in 1987. Gillet's story is told in the book The Pacific Alone (2018) by Dave Shively.
- Howard Rice accomplished a solo circumnavigation around Cape Horn in 1989.

1990s

- Rebecca Ridgway was the first woman to circumnavigate Cape Horn in 1992. Her journey is chronicled in her book Something Amazing: Cape Wrath to Cape Horn by Way of Peru (1993).
- Michael Herman kayaked from Thunder Bay (Ontario) to Toronto Canada in 1994, described in his book No Roads to Follow: Kayaking the Great Lakes Solo (2011).
- Adventurer Chris Duff circumnavigated Ireland in 1996. Duff's journey was chronicled in his book On Celtic Tides (1999).

2000s

- Jon Turk and his team were the first to cross the Bering Strait as they paddled from Japan to Alaska in 2000. Turk writes about the expedition in his book In the Wake of the Jomon (2005).
- Ken Campbell circumnavigated Newfoundland in Canada in 2000. His book Around the Rock (2004) describes the journey.
- Chris Duff circumnavigated New Zealand's South Island in 2000. Detailed in his book Southern Exposure (2003).
- Peter Bray crossed the Atlantic Ocean solo from Canada to Ireland in 2001. Deatiled in his book Kayak Across the Atlantic (2015).
- Trys Morris, Gemma Rawlings and Justine Curgenven successfully circumnavigated Tasmania in 2004. This journey is featured in the documentary film This Is The Sea 2 (2006).
- Fiona Whitehead circumnavigated Great Britain and Ireland in 2004 in 93 paddling days, 140 days in total.
- In May 2004, Mark Western completed the first solo circumnavigation of Taiwan in 34 days.
- Harry Whelan, Barry Shaw and Phil Clegg are considered to have been the fastest around Great Britain in 2005, completing the circumnavigation in 80 days.
- In November 2005 the first kayak circumnavigation of South Georgia in the Southern Atlantic was completed by The Adventure Philosophy team of Graham Charles, Marcus Waters and Mark Jones in 18 days, a distance of 600 km.
- Eric Stiller and Tony Brown unsuccessfully attempted circumnavigation of Australia. The trip ended in failure roughly a third of the way through. Described in the book Keep Australia on your left (2002).
- Rotem Ron completed the first solo kayak circumnavigation of Iceland in 2006. The following year in 2007, Freya Hoffmeister and Greg Stamer also circumnavigated Iceland achieving the fastest time.
- In 2008, Justin Jones and James Castrission (Cas and Jonesy) kayaked 3318 km across the Tasman Sea from Australia to New Zealand, becoming the first people to cross the Tasman Sea from Australia to New Zealand in a kayak. The journey took a total of 60 days, 20 hours and 50 minutes for crossing.
- Freya Hoffmeister achieves the fastest circumnavigation of South Island New Zealand in 2008.
- American kayaker Marcus Demuth completed the first solo circumnavigation of the Falkland Islands on January 26, 2009. The trip took 22 Days, with 4 days off (Jan 5th to Jan 26th, 2009). Distance covered: 639 miles.
- In July 2009, Patrick Winterton and Mick Berwick completed the first unsupported kayak crossing from Scotland to the Faroe Islands.

== See also ==
- Folding boat
- Folding kayak
- Hannes Lindemann
