= Canoe surfing =

Canoe surfing may refer to:

- Surf ski
- Whitewater canoeing
- Surf Kayaking
