= Nigel Foster (kayaker) =

English kayaker (born 1952)

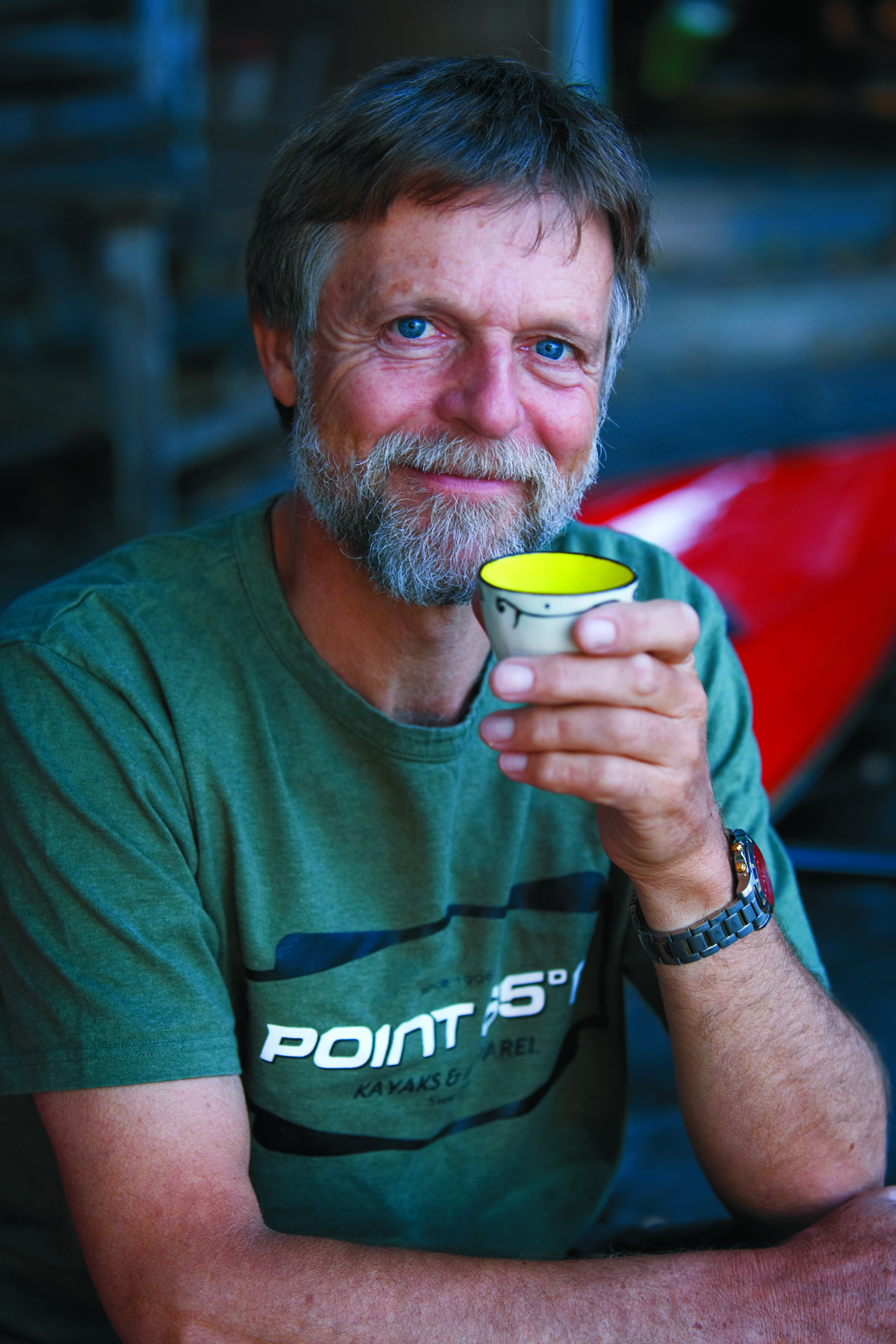
- English kayaker
- Born: 17 October 1952 (age 73); St Albans, Hertfordshire, England

Nigel Foster (born 17 October 1952) is an English sea kayaker, kayak designer, instructor and author. He is the first and youngest paddler to circle Iceland by kayak.

Foster started paddling in Brighton, England when he was 15 in a skin-on-frame kayak. At Burwash Place Outdoor Activity Centre, Burwash, Sussex, England, Foster learned to handle whitewater, sea kayaking and surf kayaking. From 1971 to 1972, he was employed there as a "trainee instructor". He enjoyed the mix of Outdoor Activity instruction and Environmental Studies education and decided to pursue this as a career. He attended a three-year teachers training course at Redland College, Bristol, and gained classroom experience with two years teaching at a school in Buckinghamshire.

In 1977, after his Iceland circumnavigation, Foster was employed by East Sussex County Council to teach as "instructor/teacher" at Burwash Place. Later in 1977, he was promoted to deputy warden.

At the same time he continued his explorations with trips that included the Atlantic coast of Newfoundland and a voyage from the English Channel through France down to the Mediterranean. In 1981, when the center was closed as part of regional cutbacks to education spending, he was redeployed as a schoolteacher, but resigned in summer 1981 to attempt a major kayak expedition – a solo trip from Iqaluit 63°44′55″N 68°31′11″W at the SE end of Baffin Island along Frobisher Bay to Resolution Island 61°30′N 65°00′W. He had to cross the 40 miles (64 km) of open water in the Hudson Strait to reach Lacy Island 60°40′32″N 64°35′54″W, northernmost of the Button Islands and part of the Northern Coast of Labrador.

The tidal range in this area may exceed 40 feet (12 m) while tidal streams may run at more than seven knots. After fighting the tidal streams in the dark near the Button Islands, suffering frostbitten fingers and loss of gear, Foster eventually gave up on this expedition. He was able to catch a ride on an oil tanker that happened to have taken shelter behind Killiniq Island 60°22′00″N 64°37′00″W. The trip was described by the editor of the BCU Canoeing Handbook in 1989 as "arguably the most impressive of any sea kayak adventure in the world."

After his return to England – from 1982 to 1985 – he worked as an instructor at the Plas Menai, National Water Sports Centre, North Wales, primarily instructing kayaking, canoeing, boardsailing, mountaineering, with a little water-skiing, and sailing, gaining the following British Canoe Union (BCU) national qualifications in these fields.

- BCU Level 5 Coach Sea Kayak
- BCU Level 5 Coach Surf Kayak
- BCU Level 3 Coach Inland Kayak (also 5 Star Award Inland Kayak)
- BCU Level 3 Coach Open Canoe (also 5 Star Award Open Canoe)

He also served for many years on the BCU Sea Touring Committee, and the BCU Expeditions Sub-Committee.

Nigel Foster, Hudson Straits Expeditions
Red = 1981, Green = 2004

In 1985, he left for Iceland for six weeks where he helped an expedition group from Cambridge with logistics and by leading the kayaking component. He returned to start his own kayaking business. He taught local groups in Denmark, Sweden, Iceland, Finland, Canada and the United States.

The design label "Foster Rowe" emerged for a while as a collaboration with two other top kayak coaches, (Andy Middleton & Ray Rowe) with products such as paddling jackets, personal flotation devices (PFDs) and tow-systems designed for leading edge performance.

Subsequently working alone, the "Nigel Foster" signature paddle blade was released by Nimbus in Canada, and Foster worked in a design/consultant capacity with companies including Liquidlogic, Bending Branches and Extrasport in USA. (e.g., ExtraSport Tow-system).

Late in the summer of 2004, accompanied by Kristin Nelson, he finally completed Baffin Island to Labrador expedition by paddling from Kuujjuaq 58°06′24″N 68°23′55″W in Ungava Bay to Nain 56°32′32″N 61°41′34″W – a distance of over 675 miles (1,086 km) of uninhabited coastline – in which there were numerous encounters with polar bears.

In 2008, at the 6th Annual Induction Ceremony, Foster was inducted into the International Halls of Fame: Bicycling, Rowing, Canoeing, Kayaking as a Kayaker.

Since 2007, Foster has been the head of research and development at Point65. In addition to designing products for Point65, he also acts as a spokesperson and assists the company with PR, marketing and special events. Foster presently lives in Seattle, WA with his wife Kristin Nelson.

== Published works ==
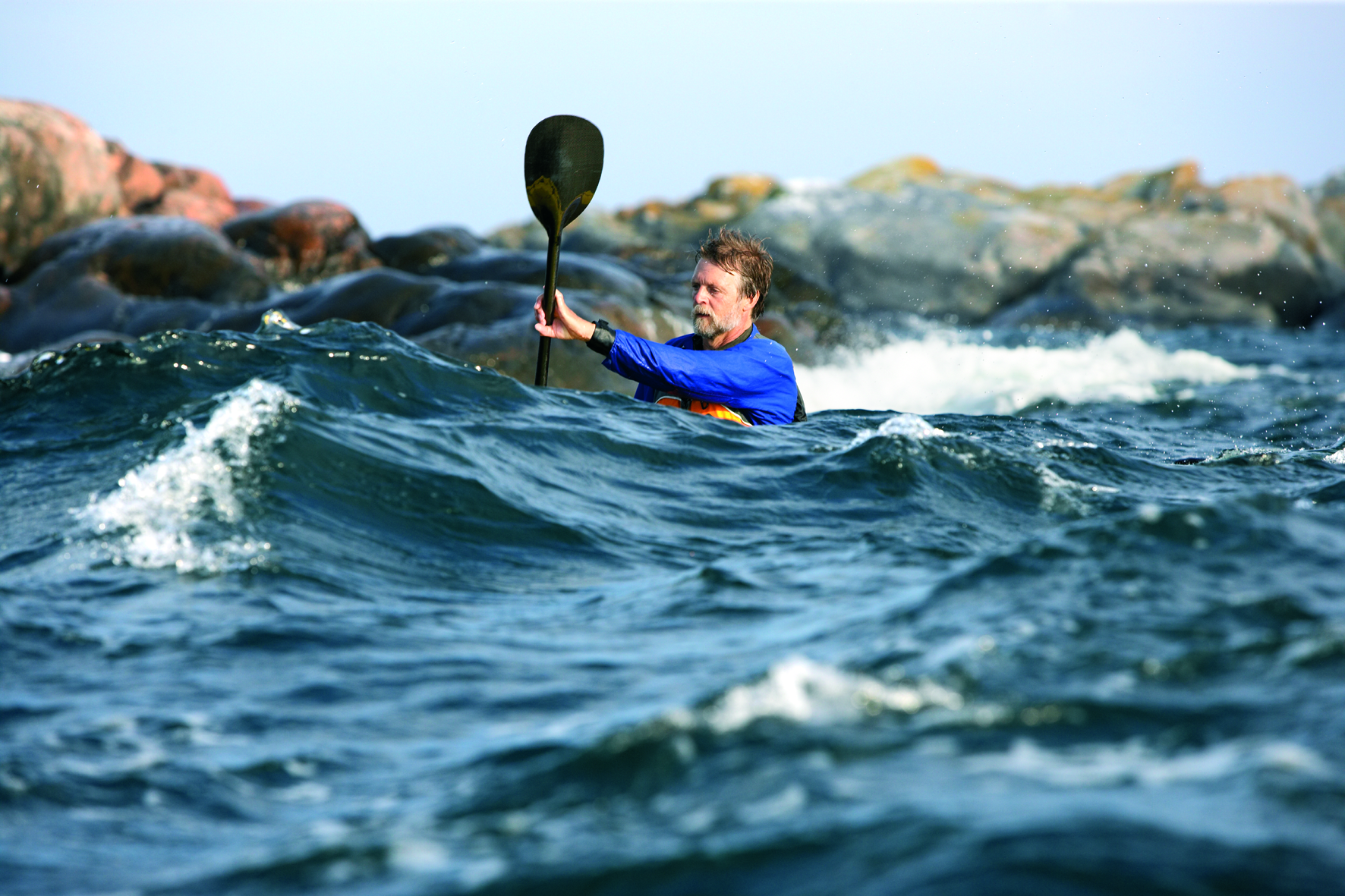
Nigel Foster, English kayaker. Off the island Öja, Sweden 2009

- Storry, T, Ed. (1986) Snowdonia White Water Sea and Surf Appendix 1, 'The Sea Birds of North Wales, by Nigel Foster', pp 146–151, Milnthorpe Cumbria: Cicerone Press, ISBN 0-902363-77-8
- Storry, T., Baillie, M. and Foster, N. (1989). Raging Rivers, Stormy Seas. Dobbs Ferry: Sheridan House Inc, ISBN 0-946609-60-8
- Rowe, R, British Canoe Union et al. (1989) British Canoe Union Canoeing Handbook. second edition, Nottingham : British Canoe Union, ISBN 0-900082-04-6
- Foster, N. (1990) Canoeing: A Beginner's Guide to the Kayak. Arundel: Fernhurst Books, ISBN 978-0-906754-50-4
- Foster, N. (1997) Nigel Foster's Sea Kayaking. 2nd ed. West Sussex, England: Globe Pequot, ISBN 0-7627-0132-3
- Foster, N. (1998). Nigel Foster's Surf Kayaking. Guilford: The Globe Pequot Press, ISBN 0-7627-0218-4
- Foster, N. (1999) Guide to Sea Kayaking in Southern Florida. Guilford: Globe Pequot, ISBN 0-7627-0336-9
- Foster, N. (2003) Open Canoe Technique: a Complete Guide to Paddling the Open Canoe. Guilford: Globe Pequot, ISBN 0-7627-3085-4
- Foster, N. (2006) Kayaking: a Beginner's Guide. Arundel: Wiley, ISBN 1-898660-52-2
- Foster, N. (2009) Stepping Stones: of Ungava and Labrador. Parker CO: Outskirts Press, ISBN 978-1-4327-4555-4
- Foster, N. (2012) Encounters from a Kayak: Native People, Sacred Places and Hungry Polar Bears. Falcon Guides, ISBN 978-0-7627-8106-5
- Foster, N. (2016) On Polar Tides: Paddling and surviving the coast of Northern Labrador. Falcon, ISBN 978-1-4930-2568-8
- Foster, N. (2017) Paddling Southern Florida: A guide to the area's greatest paddling adventures. Falcon Guides, ISBN 978-1-4930-2566-4
- Foster, N. (2017) The Art of Kayaking: Everything you need to know about paddling. Falcon. ISBN 978-1-4930-2570-1
- Foster, N (2021) Heart of Toba: Batak Life beside the World's Largest Caldera Lake. Nigel Kayaks. ISBN 978-1736420300
- Foster, N. (2021) Kayak across France: A canal and River Adventure Unlocked. Nigel Kayaks. ISBN 978-1-7364203-1-7
- Foster, N. (2023) Iceland by Kayak: The First Circumnavigation of Iceland by Kayak. Nigel Kayaks. ISBN 978-1-7364203-3-1 , ISBN 978-1-7364203-2-4
- Foster, N. (2025) Just One More:Guitar, Kayak, Coffee Nigel Kayaks ISBN 978-1-7364203-4-8
- Foster, N. (2025) What Color is Water? decoding what we see Nigel Kayaks. ISBN 978-1-7364203-5-5
- Foster, N. 'Winging It', Sea Kayaker, June 1996
- Foster, N. 'Paddle Float Rescue', Sea Kayaker, February 1997
- Foster, N. 'Kayaking with Polar Bears', Adventure Kayak Magazine, February 2010
- see also http://nigelkayaks.com Magazine Articles

== Filmography ==
Nigel Foster Sea Kayaking Series six instructional sea kayaking DVDs produced by Starling Productions, Inc.. Play by play log.

1. Getting Started
2. Essential Strokes
3. Directional Control
4. Rescues
5. Forward Paddling
6. Rolling and Bracing
- Kayaking La Bufadora 2008 on YouTube
- Sea kayaking the Vogalonga, Venice Italy 2008 on YouTube
- Rockhopping in Baja 2009 on YouTube
- Oregon Coast 2009 on YouTube
- Florida Manatees 2010 on YouTube
- Baja 2010 on YouTube

== Kayak Designs ==
- Vyneck – Foster first design in 1977 – an expedition kayak produced in association with Keith Robinson
- Rumour – Touring kayak built by Current Designs

The "Legend Series" produced by Seaward Kayaks are three expedition-capable sea kayaks designed for easy and fast cruising.

- Legend
- Silhouette sized for the smaller paddler
- Shadow sized for the larger paddler

The "Whisky Series" produced by Point65

- Whisky18 a longer version of the Whisky16 – no longer in production
- Whisky16 a rough-water playboat

Also built by Point 65

- Cappucino a day boat – no longer in production
- DoubleShot a tandem sea kayak

== Sources ==
- Connecticut Sea Kayakers: Newsletter, June 1997
- Connecticut Sea Kayakers: Newsletter, May 2005
- Mats Bengtsson kayaking and kayak techniques: 'A One Day Kayak Course with Kayak Guru Nigel Foster'
- Sea Kayak Podcasts: 'Nigel Foster – the coach all sea kayak coaches respect. Another great personal tale.'
- Sweetwaterkayaks: 'Nigel Foster'
- Point65: 'Nigel Foster joins Point65!'
- Point65: 'Introducing the Whisky 16 and DoubleShot'
