= Derek Hutchinson =

British sea kayaker, author and designer (1933–2012)

- Born: 30 June 1933; South Shields, England
- Died: 10 October 2012 (aged 79); South Shields, England
- Occupations: Sea kayaker, author, designer, teacher

Derek Charles Hutchinson (30 June 1933 – 10 October 2012) was a British sea kayaker, author, instructor, and designer, referred to as "the father of sea kayaking".

== Early life ==
Hutchinson was born in South Shields, England, on 30 June 1933. He served as a military police officer in the British Army before working as a plumber and pipe fitter in a local shipyard. Later, Hutchinson trained as a teacher at New College, Durham, and taught craft, design, and technology at Greenwell School in Gateshead for 25 years.

He discovered kayaking in 1963 after taking a one-day course and became captivated by the sport. He developed his skills during the 1960s and 1970s, eventually becoming a senior coach with the British Canoe Union (BCU) and contributing to develop coaching programmes and awards for sea kayaking.

== Career and expeditions ==
Hutchinson helped establish one of the first kayak lifeguard rescue units in the United Kingdom and designed numerous kayaks, introducing watertight bulkheads and hatches as standard features. Boats like the Baidarka, the Umnak, the Ice Flow, the Gulf Stream, the Sirius and the Orion are now widespread around the world. In 1975 he led a failed attempt to cross the North Sea by kayak, but succeeded the following year with Tom Catsky and Dave Hellywell, completing the journey from Felixstowe to Ostend in 31 hours, a record recognised by the Guinness Book of Records. His later expeditions included paddling Scotland’s Corryvreckan whirlpool, Alaska’s Inland Passage, and a circumnavigation of Prince Edward Island.

Hutchinson wrote more than a dozen books, notably Sea Canoeing (1976), later retitled The Complete Book of Sea Kayaking, which became a standard reference work for the sport.

== Later life and death ==
A frequent lecturer and storyteller, Hutchinson continued teaching (on-water) well into his late seventies. He died of cancer at his home in South Shields on 10 October 2012, aged 79. He was survived by his partner, Maureen Cook, his two sons and a daughter. His wife, Helene, had died in 2004.
