= Lug sail =

Type of sail

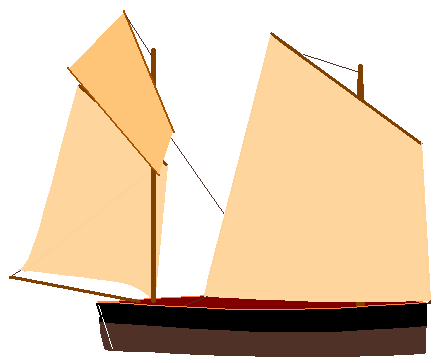
A lugger, showing a variety of lug sail types.

The lug sail, or lugsail, is a fore-and-aft, four-cornered sail that is suspended from a spar, called a yard. When raised, the sail area overlaps the mast. For "standing lug" rigs, the sail may remain on the same side of the mast on both the port and starboard tacks. For "dipping lug" rigs, the sail is lowered partially or totally to be brought around to the leeward side of the mast in order to optimize the efficiency of the sail on both tacks.

The lug sail is evolved from the square sail to improve how close the vessel can sail into the wind. Square sails, on the other hand, are symmetrically mounted in front of the mast and are manually angled to catch the wind on opposite tacks. Since it is difficult to orient square sails fore and aft or to tension their leading edges (luffs), they are not as efficient upwind, compared with lug sails. The lug rig differs from the gaff rig, also fore-and-aft, whose sail is instead attached at the luff to the mast and is suspended from a spar (gaff), which is attached to, and raised at an angle from, the mast.

== Types ==
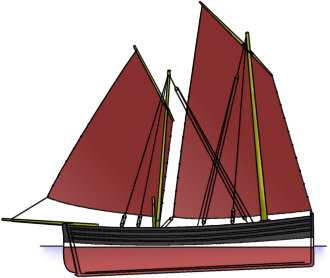
A sailing Fifie, showing the difference between a standing lug (aft – left) and a dipping lug (fore – right).

Lug sails are divided into three types: standing lug, balance lug (or balanced lug) and dipping lug.

- Dipping lug: This is a boom-less sail whose yard is lowered or "dipped" when tacking to bring the sail around to the leeward side of the mast. In some cases this can be done by partially lowering the yard - there are a number of variations in this procedure. The tack fastens to a point some distance forward of the mast. For a foresail this may be the stemhead or, in some boats, one of a choice of hooks set along each gunwale. The dipping lug is a powerful sail and was widely used in working craft.
- Standing lug: The sail and yard remain on one side of the mast and the tack of the sail is set close to the mast. When the wind blows onto the side of the mast where the sail is mounted, it deforms the sail over the mast. A standing lug can be used with or without a boom - the latter being the preference for working craft. The standing lug differs from the balance rig. On a standing lug the yard extends past the mast, but the foot of the sail does not.
- Balance lug (or balanced lug): The sail has both a yard and a boom, which both extend past the mast and remain on the same side of the mast on either tack. Junk rig, a fully battened sail that crosses the mast at the head and foot, has similarities to a balance lug, but has multiple control lines, making the rigging and operation very different from the simplicity of a balance lug.

== Procedures for tacking by dipping ==
Whereas a standing lug may be tacked conventionally by moving the sail across the vessel, as the wind crosses the bow, a dipping lug must be brought around to the leeward side by a multi-step procedure:

1. Hauling in the sheets to get the sail over the boat.
2. Lowering the halyard so that the peak of the sail can be reached, yet the yard is free of interfering with the rest of the boat.
3. Gathering the after part of the sail and bringing it around forward of the mast.
4. Bringing the peak down and passing it under the luff of the sail to the new leeward side.
5. Bringing the halyard to windward aft of the mast.
6. Shackling on the sheets and bringing the sail aft.
7. Rehoisting the sail and sheeting in.

This procedure is also necessary for gybing a dipping lug. Reportedly, this action can be completed expeditiously on a larger boat with four hands. On smaller boats, the sail is simply lowered and the mast unstepped to allow the sail to be moved beneath it to the other side and the mast to be re-stepped and the sail raised.

On larger luggers, like the Fifie, large dipping lug sails were possible only with the introduction of steam-powered capstans to facilitate with dipping.

== Extent of use ==
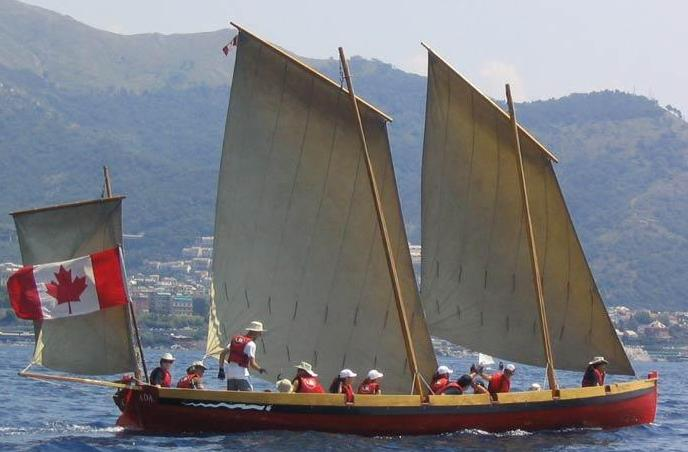
A replica of a longboat from the French frigate La Résolue The original was captured in 1786 in Bantry and is now in the National Museum of Ireland. Such replicas are referred to as a Yole de Bantry.

The rig was widely used in Europe from the seventeenth through the nineteenth centuries for small fishing vessels and other coasters because of their good performance to windward. This popularity extended to smugglers and privateers and the French chasse-marée fishing boats.

Currently, lug rigs are used on certain small sailing craft, like the International Twelve Foot Dinghy, a dinghy, the SCAMP, a pocket cruiser, and the Oz Goose 12-foot (3.7 m) sailing dinghy.

There are several lug rigged boat classes of long history that have been raced more or less continuously for a century. One example is the balance lug rigged Lymington Scow that has become highly developed in almost continuous racing since 1905.

== See also ==
- Lugger
- Junk rig, also known as the Chinese lugsail
- Tanja sail, a type of sail from Nusantara archipelago
