= Howard Rice =

Howard Rice is an American small boat sailor, sailing canoeist and small craft skills instructor. In 1979, he started an around the world trip intended to last more than 2 years. In 1989-1990, he sailed and paddled a canoe solo around Cape Horn, Chile. In 2017, he sailed a 11 ft sailboat solo down the Strait of Magellan from Patagonia to Tierra del Fuego.

== Solo trips ==
=== Around the world trip (1974) ===
In 1974, Rice set sail for a solo around the world trip expected to last three years. A 30,000 mile trip in 18.5 ft sailing boat beginning with a two month-long sea trial. Rice departed in November 1974. and sailed as far as the Caribbean until lack of money to continue halted the voyage. He sold his boat and enrolled in Michigan State University where he earned a bachelor degree.

=== Around Cape Horn (1989–1990) ===
In December 1989 to March 1990, Rice sailed and paddled a 15' 2" sailing canoe solo twice around Cape Horn, Chile. Articles about his expedition appeared in Outside Magazine, Sports Illustrated and Yachting Magazine. He utilized a Klepper folding canoe often referred to as a sailing canoe. His route took him down the Beagle Channel through the Wollaston Islands to Cape Horn Hornos Island and back as far west as Timbales in the western Beagle Channel. Rice reached Cape Horn in mid-January. While at Cape Horn, he double rounded east to west and then west to east.

Rice prepared for the effort by extensive training for two years, including sessions with ocean kayaker Eric Stiller using a number of canoe sailing training sessions in winter conditions. His training included paddling and sailing the Hudson River in New York at times with temperatures below zero. Other training venues included the Great Lakes and the Maine Island Trail.

Rice was awarded a certificate of merit commemorating his voyage around Cape Horn by the Armada de Chile (Chilean Navy) at Puerto Williams Chile on March 11, 1990, as the first solo sailing canoe to successfully round and double Cape Horn.

=== Tierra del Fuego (2017) ===
From January 2017 through April 2017 he solo sailed an 11' 11" modified SCAMP sailboat he built down the Strait of Magellan from Patagonia into Tierra del Fuego, the western Beagle Channel and the Southern Ocean. He built the boat specifically for this voyage.

== Personal life ==
In 1992, Rice set up the Great Lakes Outdoor Center in Harbor Springs to offer outdoor trips and expeditions.

After his Cape Horn voyage, Rice and Stiller worked on behalf of Klepper America and conducted small craft training sessions at Naval Air Station Key West, Key West, Florida US Army Special Forces and Navy SEAL MAROPS and Fort Campbell, Kentucky. In this role, Rice delivered small boat specific training as an instructor/trainer in small boat handling techniques and marine operations. He authored the operations section in the US Army Special Forces MAROPS manual pertaining to one and two-man folding boat use.
