= SCAMP (boat) =

Sailboat design by Small Craft Advisor Magazine

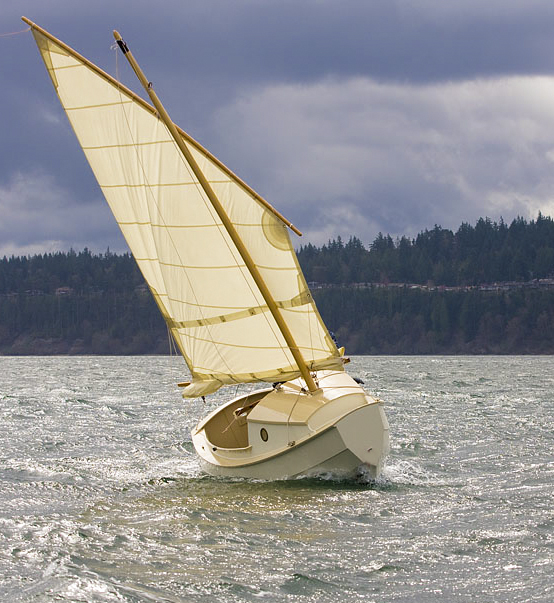
- SCAMP Sailboat

Development
- Designer: John Welsford
- Design: One-Design

Boat
- Crew: 2
- Draft: 7 in (180 mm) up

Hull
- Type: Monohull
- Construction: Cold molded plywood GRP with wood trim
- Hull weight: 420 lb (190 kg) (including rig)
- LOA: 11 ft 11 in (3.63 m)
- Beam: 5 ft 4 in (1.63 m)

Rig
- Rig type: Balanced Lug Rig

Sails
- Mainsail area: 100 ft^{2} (9.3 m^{2})

The SCAMP (acronym of Small Craft Advisor Magazine Project) is a wooden or fiberglass hulled Balanced Lug rigged sailing dinghy. The boat is 11 ft 11 in (3.63 m) long, and capable of accommodating four persons on a daysail or one to two for overnighting or extended cruising. Craig Wagner and Josh Colvin, editors of Small Craft Advisor Magazine, teamed up with noted New Zealand boat designer, John Welsford, to create what they call a "Mini Microcruiser" sailboat. Welsford considers it possibly the best boat he's designed, based on "suitability for purpose". Some early plans details received subsequent revisions by Kees Prins and the Northwest Maritime Center. While no particular feature of the boat is unprecedented, the combination of design elements has produced a "new genre of sailboat".

== History ==
In the course of publishing Small Craft Advisor, Craig and Josh had sailed more than 70 small boats, all the while compiling an informal list of favorite features and characteristics. Some of these ideas combined with Colvin's experience on a 150-mile cruise down the Columbia River – wishing he had a smaller, shallower boat for exploring that was still capable of coping with the river's sometimes challenging conditions – inspired the SCAMP concept. The emphasis was on "minimalism, efficiency and ease of use." In January 2010 they contacted John Welsford and started the design process. Building commenced at the Northwest Maritime Center in July 2010.

On November 10, 2010, at 1415, SCAMP #1 was first launched and test sailed on Port Townsend Bay in Puget Sound. Subsequent SCAMP sea trials and capsize testing were performed by Howard Rice.

Builder's plans were released for sale first, followed by CNC-cut kits. Gig Harbor Boat Works completed the first fiberglass production SCAMP in July 2013 and is currently the only manufacturer of fiberglass SCAMPs.

== Design elements ==
- Pram bow - allows for a greater beam for any given length. Don't have to pull the forward plank ends together. More volume and therefore buoyancy forward.
- Stowage cabin - The cuddy on SCAMP serves many purposes. The overhanging cabin top acts like a dodger and is large enough for an adult to sit athwartships out of the weather. Additionally, items in forward lockers can be accessed without water getting into storage area. Stowage cabin also houses a mast box that supports more of the mast than is possible with open boats. This in turn allows for an unstayed mast.
- Balanced lug rig (Lug sail) - The balanced lug rig provides a number of advantages
  - Unstayed - no stays, sail can pivot all the way forward if need be increasing safety
  - The part of the sail in front of the mast "balances" the pressure of the wind on the sail. When tacking it catches the wind and helps the sail pivot across. When gybing it reduces the amount of force when the boom comes across. When running downwind it keeps the center of effort closer to the centerline of the boat reducing weather helm
  - Once the sail is raised, the sailor only has to manage one sheet, making it easy to singlehand.
- The "off set-centerboard" is in a case that is on the starboard side of the cockpit under the seat. This provides for an unobstructed cockpit and a place to sleep when at anchor. The centerboard and the rudder are based on NACA airfoil shapes to provide lift when moving through the water.
- Skegs - Two skegs are mounted on the bottom. These provide a flatter base to support the boat above the bottom when grounding or beaching for protection and leveling.
- Buoyancy - A stock SCAMP has five separate watertight buoyancy areas, forward under the cuddy, below the floor of the cuddy, the aft area under the cockpit, and each seat.
- Water ballast - Centrally located under the cockpit sole, a water ballast chamber holds approximately 170 lb (77 kg) of ballast down low where it is most beneficial. This ballast can be emptied to facilitate easier rowing or trailering

== SCAMP Camps ==
In 2010 the Northwest school of Wooden Boat Building launched a series of twice-yearly SCAMP building workshops called SCAMP CAMPs. Hosted at the Northwest Maritime Center on the Port Townsend, WA waterfront, participants construct their own SCAMP from a CNC-cut kit to partial completion under the tutelage of professional boat building instructors including designer John Welsford and Howard Rice. The second in the SCAMP Camp series was held in the Great Lakes and was instructed by Howard Rice. Another SCAMP Camp was held in Port Townsend, WA on April 19–20, 2014. In 2015 there were Camps too. Through 2017 there have been over eighty boats built in these workshop held across the county. Dates and locations are often posted at The Pocket Yacht http://www.thepocketyacht.com as well as at Small Craft Advisor http://smallcraftadvisor.com

== One-design class ==
In 2012 SCAMP established a one-design class with the United States Sailing Association. All SCAMP plans, kits, and fiberglass boats sold are issued an automatic class sail number from SCA. Sail numbers are recorded at the SCAMP Worldwide Registry. The class sail logo is a lantern with an "s" for the flame.
