= SS Sea Scamp =

Type C3 ship S-A2 troop transport

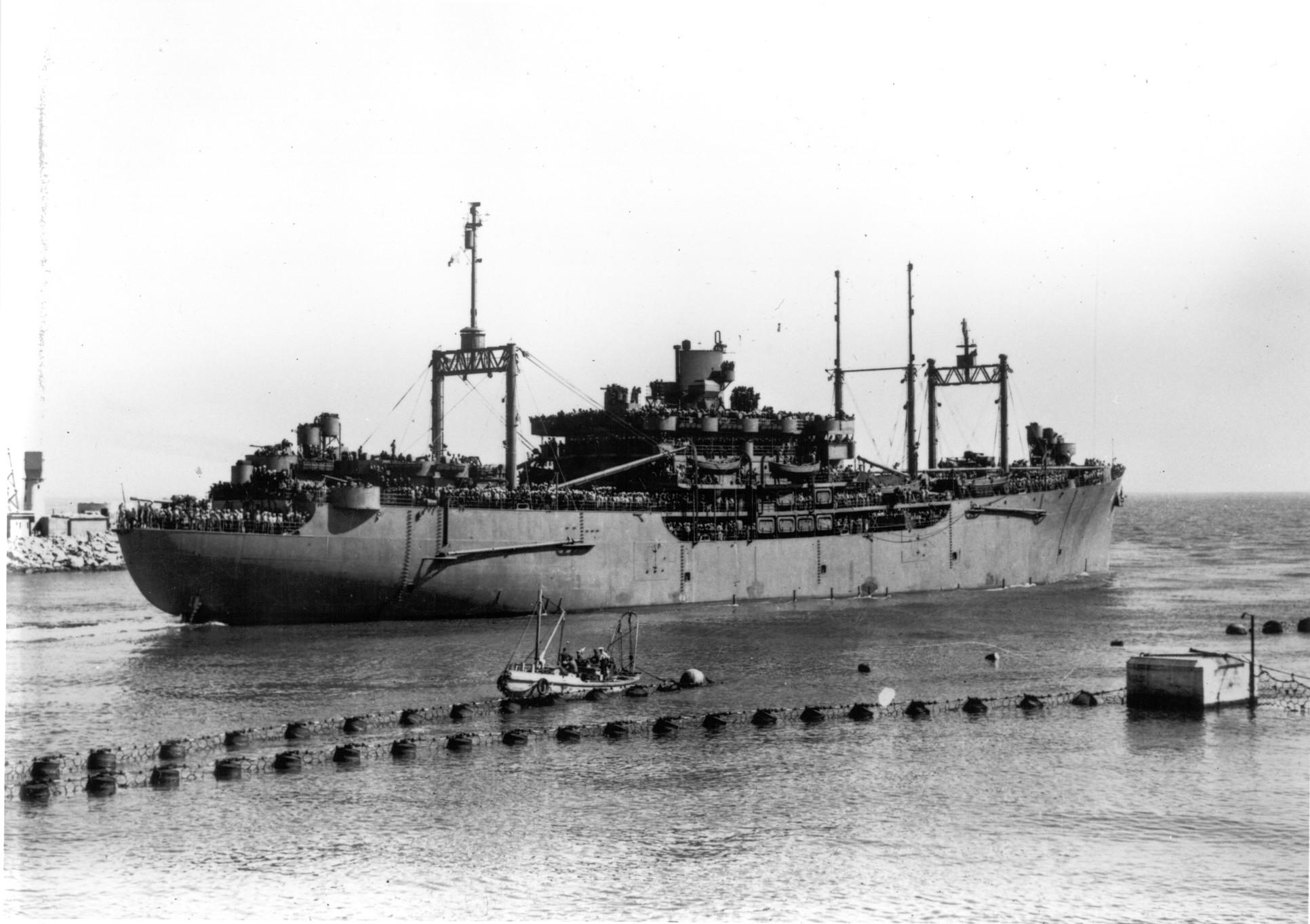
- USS Clytie was similar to Sea Scamp

History

United States
- Name: Sea Scamp
- Builder: Ingalls Shipbuilding
- Launched: 30 April 1943
- Fate: Scrapped 1971

General characteristics
- Displacement: 8,348 tons
- Length: 465 ft (142 m)
- Beam: 70 ft (21 m)
- Speed: 18 knots

USAT Sea Scamp was a Type C3 ship S-A2 troop transport that saw service in World War II.

She was launched on 30 April 1943 by Ingalls Shipbuilding in Pascagoula, Mississippi, under a Maritime Commission contract with owner Lykes Brothers Steamship Company.

Voyages

- Sailed from Oakland, CA 31 March 1944 for Finschafen, New Guinea arriving 30 April 1944
- Sailed from Hilo, Hawaii 14 July 1944 for Saipan, Marianas arriving 11 August 1944
- Sailed from San Francisco 17 November 1944 for Hollandia, New Guinea arriving 5 December 1944
- Sailed from New Guinea 25 December 1944 for San Francisco, CA arriving 17 January 1945
- Sailed from San Francisco to The Admiralty Islands February 1945
- Sailed from ? on ? for New York City, New York arriving 5 September 1945
- Sailed from New York City, New York 4 January 1946 arriving 17 January 1946 in Le Havre
- Sailed from Le Havre, France on 28 January 1946 for New York City, New York arriving 9 February 1946
- Sailed from England (?) on ? February 1946 for New York City, New York arriving 4 March 1946

The ship was purchased by Matson Line in 1947 and renamed Hawaiian Packer. The historic Kamchatka earthquake 1952 November 4 16:58:26.0 UTC Magnitude 9.0 generated a tsunami wave in Honolulu harbor which sent a cement barge from its moorings to collide against the freighter. It was sold to U.S. Maritime Commission in 1964 and renamed Pecos in 1966. It was scrapped in 1971.
