= Paul Caffyn =

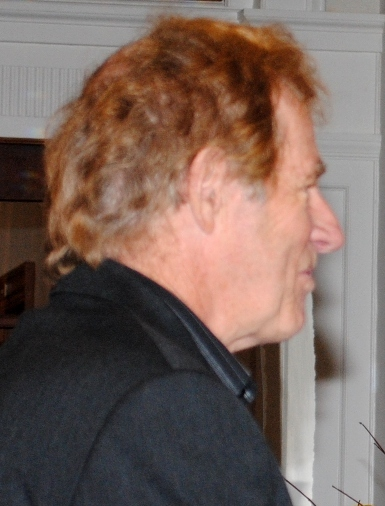
Caffyn in 2012

Paul Caffyn ONZM is a sea kayaker based in Runanga on the West Coast of New Zealand. He has completed a number of supported, unsupported, solo and group expeditions by sea kayak in various locations around the world. He has been described as follows by John Dowd:

Amongst sea kayakers Paul Caffyn is almost in a class of his own. For the longest time after he finished his awesome solo circumnavigation of Australia the silence was deafening: few of his peers knew the significance of what he had done, and perhaps those who understood felt lost in his shadows. Not only is Paul's Australian adventure a pinnacle for sea kayaking, it should eventually be recognized as one of the great small voyages of recent history along with those of Slocum, Shackleton and Franz Romer."

— John Dowd

Caffyn was appointed an Officer of the New Zealand Order of Merit in the 2012 New Year Honours, for services to sea kayaking and water safety.

== Expeditions ==
- 1978 Circumnavigation of the South Island, New Zealand

The expedition around the South Island started as an expedition along the Fiordland coast with fellow paddler Max Reynolds. Caffyn continued solo and with ground support to complete the circumnavigation in 76 days.{ source: Obscured by waves}

- 1978/79 Circumnavigation of the North Island, New Zealand

Caffyn sea kayaked solo around the North Island, with ground party support. The circumnavigation took 86 days, after which Caffyn undertook a crossing of Cook Strait by sea kayak.{source: Cresting the Restless Wave}

- 1979 Circumnavigation of Stewart Island, New Zealand

The expedition around Stewart Island was done with Max Reynolds, August and September 1979. This expedition departed from Bluff, New Zealand starting with a crossing of Foveaux Strait. { source: Dark Side of the Wave}

- 1980 Circumnavigation of Great Britain

Caffyn and Nigel Dennis circumnavigated Great Britain by sea kayak in 85 days.

- 1981/82 Circumnavigation of Australia
- 1985 solo circumnavigation of the four main islands of Japan
- 1991 completed the first solo sea kayak trip along the entire coastline of Alaska
- 1997 Circumnavigation of New Caledonia
- Two attempts to cross the Tasman Sea by sea kayak
- 2001/2002 Circumnavigation of Phuket

== Bibliography ==
Caffyn has written a number of books about his expeditions:

- The Dreamtime Voyage around Australia Kayak Odyssey ISBN 0-473-02349-0
- Cresting the Restless Wave, North Island Kayak Odyssey ISBN 0-9597823-1-1
- Dark Side of the Wave, Stewart Island Kayak Odyssey. ISBN 0-9597823-0-3
- Obscured by Waves, South Island Canoe Odyssey. ISBN 0-86868-002-8
- The Dreamtime Voyage around Australia Kayak Odyssey (25th anniversary edition) ISBN 978-0-9583584-4-6
- The Search for the Deepest Hole in the World (January 2021) by Paul Caffyn and Van Watson ISBN 978-0-9583584-3-9, Kayak Dundee Press
- The Audacious Alaskan Adventures of Kayak Dundee – by Paul Caffyn ISBN 978-0-9583584-0-8
