= Clark Scamp =

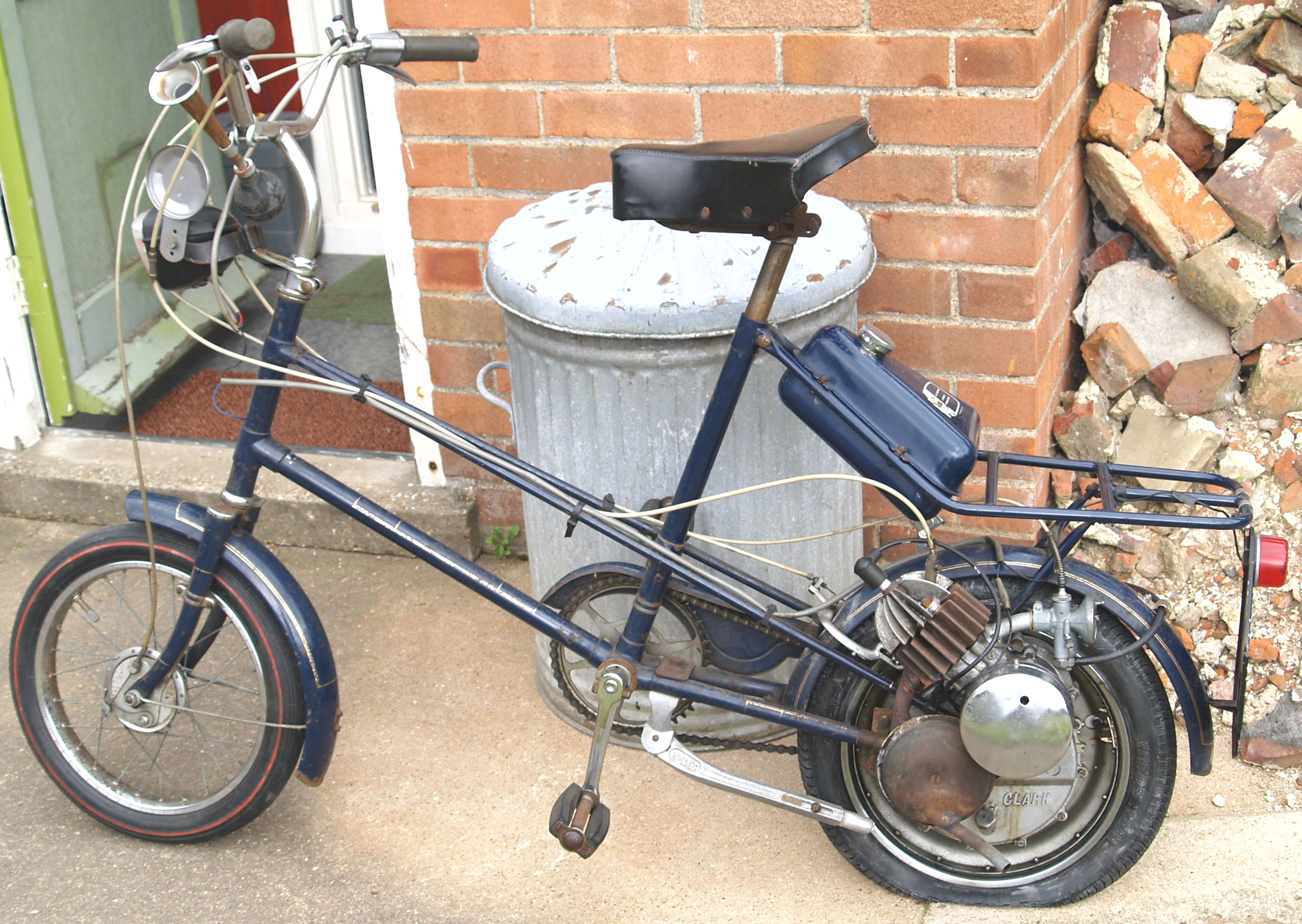
- Manufacturer: Alec Clark
- Parent company: A.N. Clark (Engineers) Ltd
- Production: 1968
- Engine: 49cc piston-ported single, twin opposed-ports, two stroke 20:1 mix, radially-finned iron barrel, radially-finned aluminium head, Dell'Orto carburettoror Amal 369/162
- Bore / stroke: 39mm x 44mm
- Top speed: 25 mph (41 km/h)
- Ignition type: Dansi flywheel magneto
- Transmission: single speed, direct drive via reduction gear
- Frame type: Co-operative (CWS), modified bicycle
- Suspension: none fitted
- Brakes: Cable-operated, 3.5 inch diameter drum front, cycle-type caliper at rear
- Tires: 12 inch Avon Cling on steel disc rear wheel, spoked front
- Fuel capacity: 0.5 gallon
- Related: handlebars and Radaelli seat both height adjustable

The Clark Scamp was a simple, bicycle-based moped similar in concept to the earlier 'winged wheel' or cycle motor, manufactured from March to November 1968 by Alec Clark, of A N Clark (Engineers) Limited, a business which normally manufactured telescopic extendable masts for antennas and small gearboxes for handtools in Binstead, Isle of Wight, England

It combined a proprietary 1960s small-wheel cycle-type frame (obtained from the Co-operative Wholesale Society which sold the bicycle as the Commuter) with modifications to mount an innovative 50cc two-stroke engine close to (and outboard of) the rear wheel.

Manufacturing principal Alec Clark was an engineer with much experience of engine design including small-capacity two-strokes, having formerly worked for Trojan, a car manufacturer in Croydon, UK which in the 1960s offered a scooter and a light three-wheeler car and had undertaken development work for Leyland

With the exception of the Italian magneto and carburettor, all of the engine work was stated to be British-made.

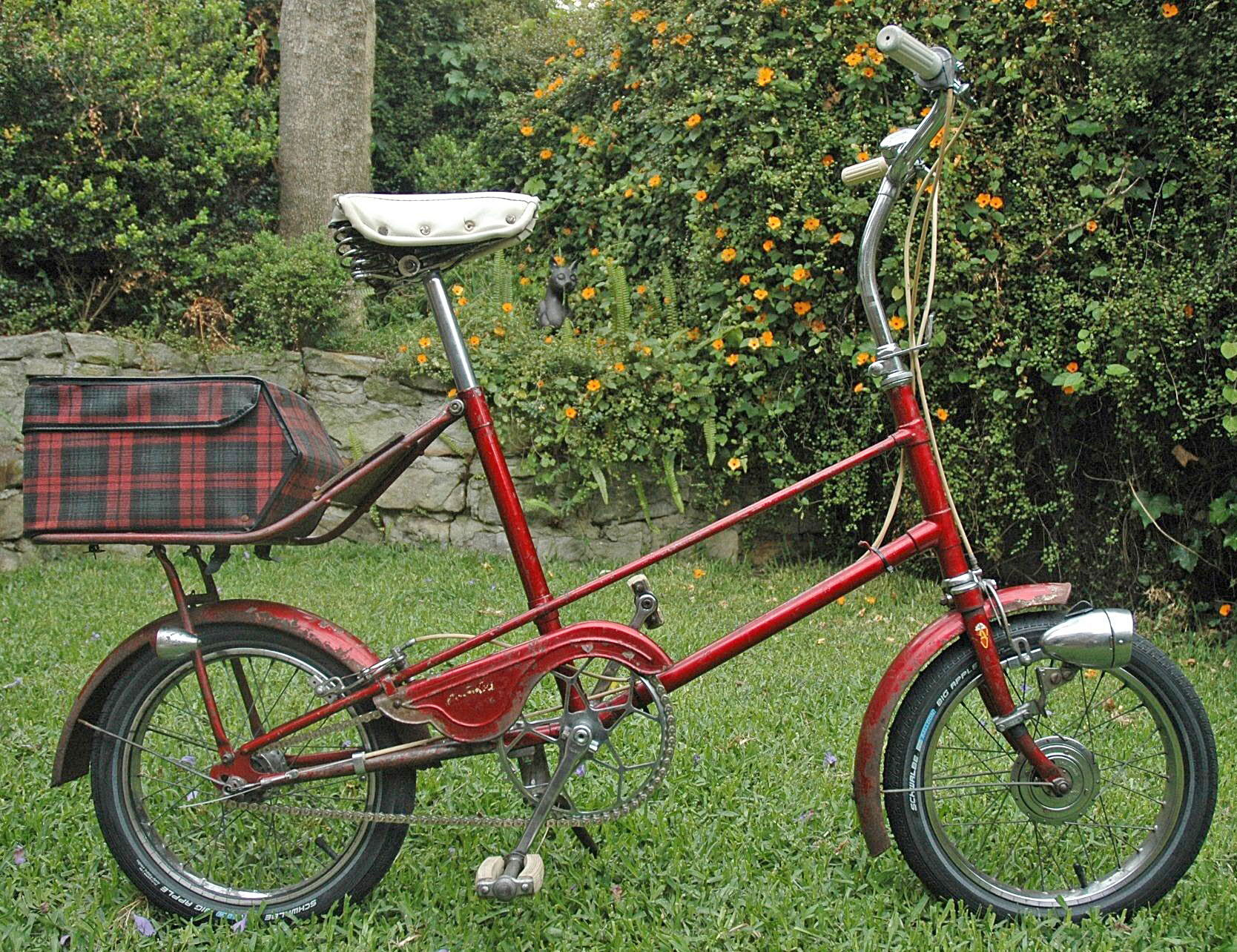
CWS Commuter bicycle used as a basis for the Scamp

Unfortunately, it was claimed by a Mr Coco that the Clark power unit was very similar to his own design which he had been trying to sell to Clarks for several months in 1967, before being informed that his design driving the rear wheel by friction caused unacceptable wear to the rear tyre and would not therefore be used.

By the time the machine appeared on the market, it had a different drive mechanism but it was apparent that the power unit was closely related to the Coco design, so the designer sued for breach of confidence in that the drawings and prototype engine had been supplied to Clark for evaluation.

The resulting case, Coco v AN Clark (Engineers) Ltd. remains a fundamental statement of the principles of law in this area. An application for an interlocutory injunction to prevent any manufacture pending a trial outcome was refused at a hearing, the defendant undertaking instead to pay a royalty of five shillings per engine to be held in a deposit account and later apportioned after a trial ruling.

The trial never took place and the machine was discontinued after a production run estimated at 3,000 to 4,000. The company known as AN Clark (Engineers) Limited went into administration, and a new business - Clark Masts Limited - was formed to carry on manufacture of the core business product.
