= Eric Stiller =

Eric Stiller is an author and watersports entrepreneur based in New York City, USA.

Stiller founded Manhattan Kayak Company in 1995 to train and guide kayakers on Manhattan’s Hudson River. David Lee Roth of Van Halen was its first customer. The operation was originally located at Chelsea Piers Sports Center and later inside of the Frying Pan, which was moored on Pier 66a. It expanded to Hudson River Park Pier 66 in 2007 and then to Hudson River Pier 84 in 2013. Stiller has since added stand-up paddle boarding, surf skiing, and outrigger canoeing to the operation.

Stiller is the author of Keep Australia on Your Left (ISBN 0-312-87459-6), the story of an attempt by Tony Brown and Stiller to kayak sail all the way around Australia. The trip lasted for four months and about 4,000 miles from Sydney to Darwin, including the first unescorted kayak crossing of the Gulf of Carpentaria. Stiller bicycled to complete the journey without Brown from Darwin to Melbourne.

Dieter Stiller, his father, introduced the Klepper folding kayak to the United States. Stiller sold Klepper kayaks at his father’s shop located in New York’s Union Square West neighborhood.
