= Surf kayaking =

Use of a kayak boat for surfing waves

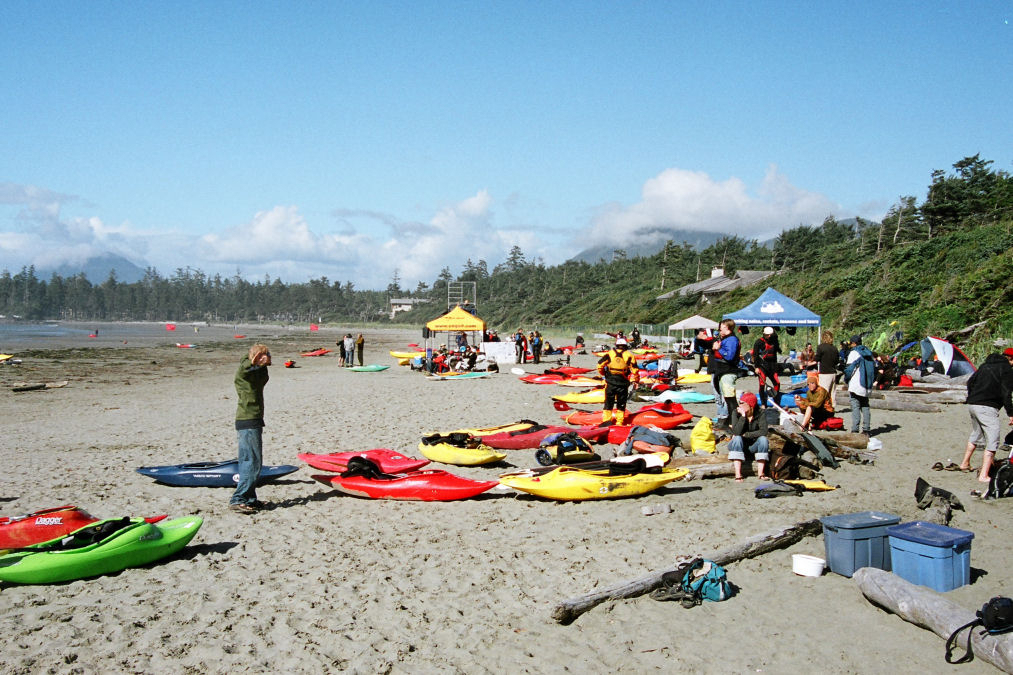
Surf kayak competition, westcoast Vancouver Island.

Surf kayaking is the sport, technique, and equipment, used in surfing ocean waves with kayaks. Surf kayaking has many similarities to surf board surfing, but with boats designed for use in surf zones, and with a paddle. A number of kayak designs are used, but all are aimed at better using the waves to propel the craft.

Surf kayaking is popular in many areas frequented by surf board surfers. The sport has grown in popularity over the last decades, in pace with the rise of sea kayaking, and modern materials and techniques.

== Equipment ==
=== Surf kayaks ===
There are a number of speciality surf kayak designs available. They are often equipped with up to four fins with a three fin thruster set up being the most common. Speciality surf kayaks typically have flat bottoms, and hard rails, similar to surf boards. The design of a surf kayak promotes the use of an ocean surf wave (moving wave) as opposed to a river or feature wave (moving water). They are typically made from glass composites (mixtures of carbon fiber, Kevlar and fiberglass) or rotomolded plastic.

Many kayaks, such as those used in whitewater kayaking on rivers or tidal rapids, are used. Many whitewater designs can be fitted with fins, to assist in control on moving surf waves. (See: Ocean surface wave, Whitewater)

Sea kayaks, generally used for day-trip or expedition kayaking, are used in surf kayaking. Due to their length, sea kayaks are difficult to manoeuvre in surf. The techniques and strategies utilized in landing kayaks safely through large, open ocean surf, even when heavily loaded, could be considered a sub-discipline of surf kayaking.

=== Paddles ===
Typically double sided kayak paddles. Length is generally proportional to dimensions of boat and paddler, but can range from 160 to 230 cm. Kayak blades are often 'feathered' (set on an angle in relation to each other), allowing the paddle to pass smoothly through the lip of a wave when paddling into breaking waves. It is not unusual for un-feathered paddles to be used as personal preference.

Occasionally single-sided 'canoe' paddles are used. This is perhaps attributed to whitewater canoe influence.

Surf kayak paddles are generally made from robust materials to last the rigours of the surf zone. Fiberglass, plastic, and carbon fiber are most common.

== Surfing Open Ocean Swell ==
When paddling in open ocean swell, it is possible to surf a kayak, thereby increasing one's speed. Ocean swell, having a longer distance between crests than wind waves, allows sea kayaks and other longer boats to surf down the front of the wave. This technique, especially when used on extended expedition trips, can add miles to a day trip.
