= Outline of canoeing and kayaking =

Overview of and topical guide to canoeing and kayaking

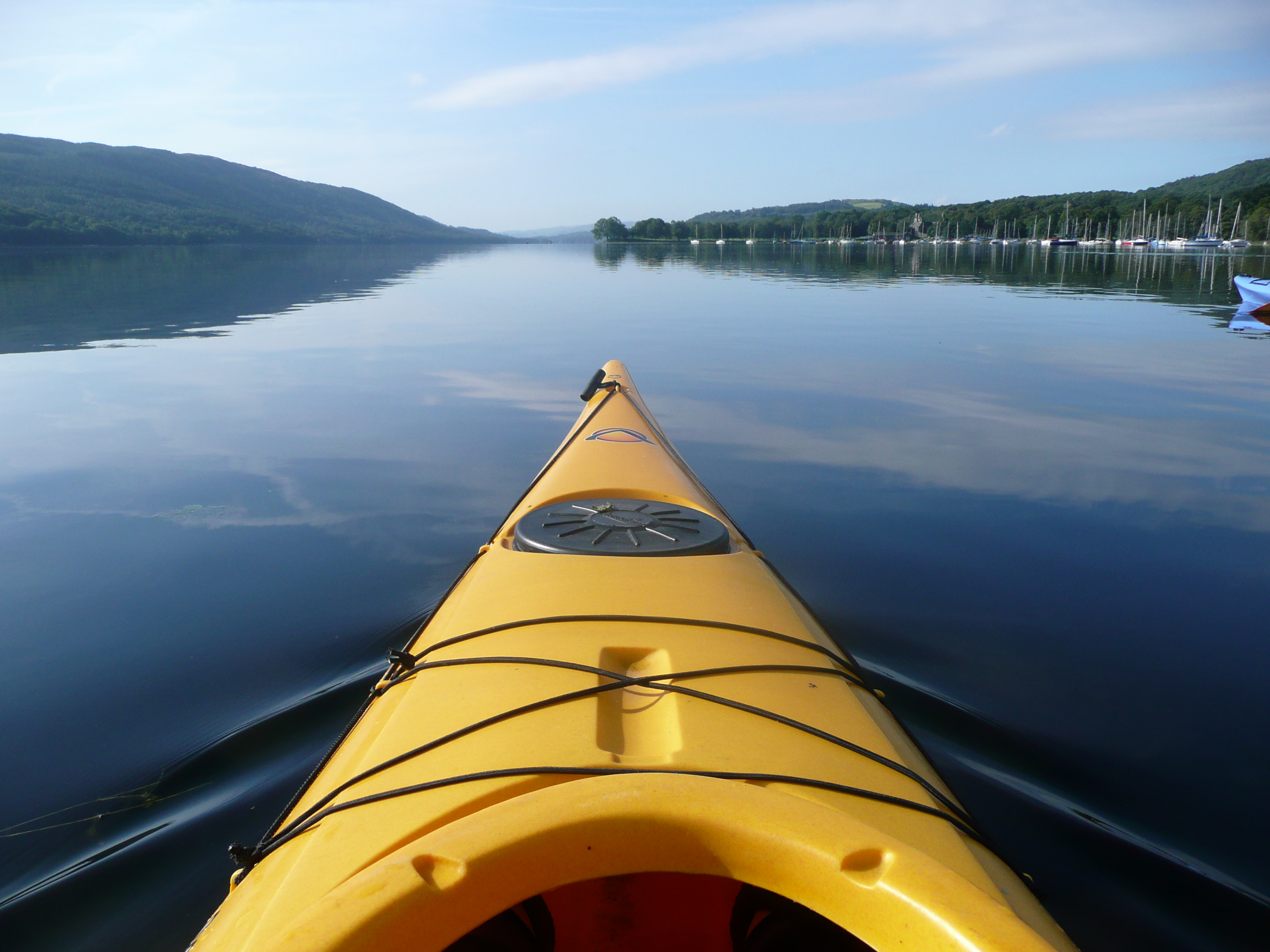
Kayaker's view of Coniston Water, Cumbria

Canoeing – recreational boating activity or paddle sport in which you kneel or sit facing forward in an open or closed-decked canoe, and propel yourself with a single-bladed paddle, under your own power.

Kayaking – use of a kayak for moving across water. It is distinguished from canoeing by the sitting position of the paddler and the number of blades on the paddle. A kayak is a boat where the paddler faces forward, legs in front, using a double-bladed paddle. Most kayaks have closed decks.

== Reasons to canoe or kayak ==
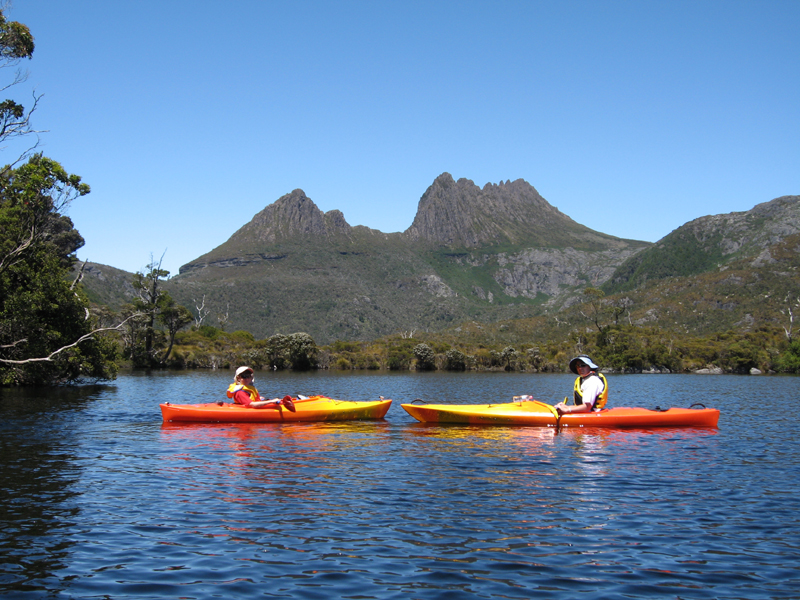
Kayaking on Dove Lake, Tasmania

- Exercise – bodily activity that enhances or maintains physical fitness and overall health or wellness.
  - Aerobic exercise – physical exercise that intends to improve the oxygen system. Aerobic means "with oxygen", and refers to the use of oxygen in the body's energy-generating process (the citric acid cycle).
- Recreation – activity of leisure, leisure being discretionary time.
  - Outdoor recreation –
- Sport – organized, competitive, entertaining, and skillful physical activity requiring commitment, strategy, and fair play, in which a winner can be defined by objective means.
  - Extreme sport – Extreme sports is a popular term for certain activities perceived as having a high level of inherent danger. These activities often involve speed, height, a high level of physical exertion, and highly specialized gear.
- Transport – movement of people and goods from one location to another.
  - Boating – travel or transport by boat; or the recreational use of a boat (whether powerboats, sailboats, or man-powered vessels such as rowing and paddle boats) focused on the travel itself or on sports activities, such as fishing.
    - Watercraft paddling – act of manually propelling and steering a small boat in the water using a blade that is joined to a shaft, known as a paddle. Not to be confused with watercraft rowing.
  - Travel – movement of people between relatively distant geographical locations for any purpose and any duration, with or without any additional means of transport.
    - Tourism – travel for recreational, leisure or business purposes.

== Canoeing and kayaking disciplines ==
Some of the many popular uses of canoes and kayaks include:

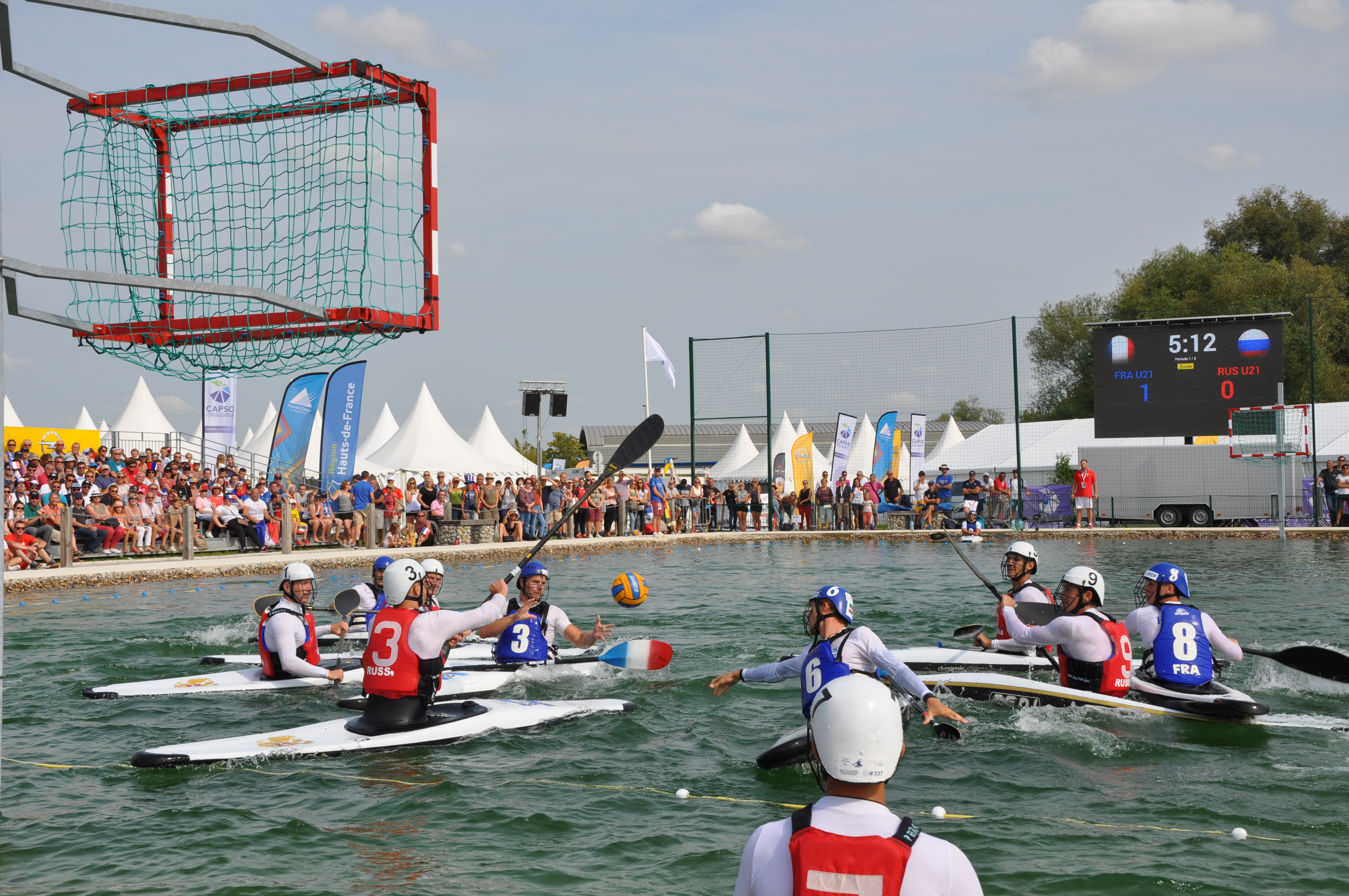
Canoe polo players

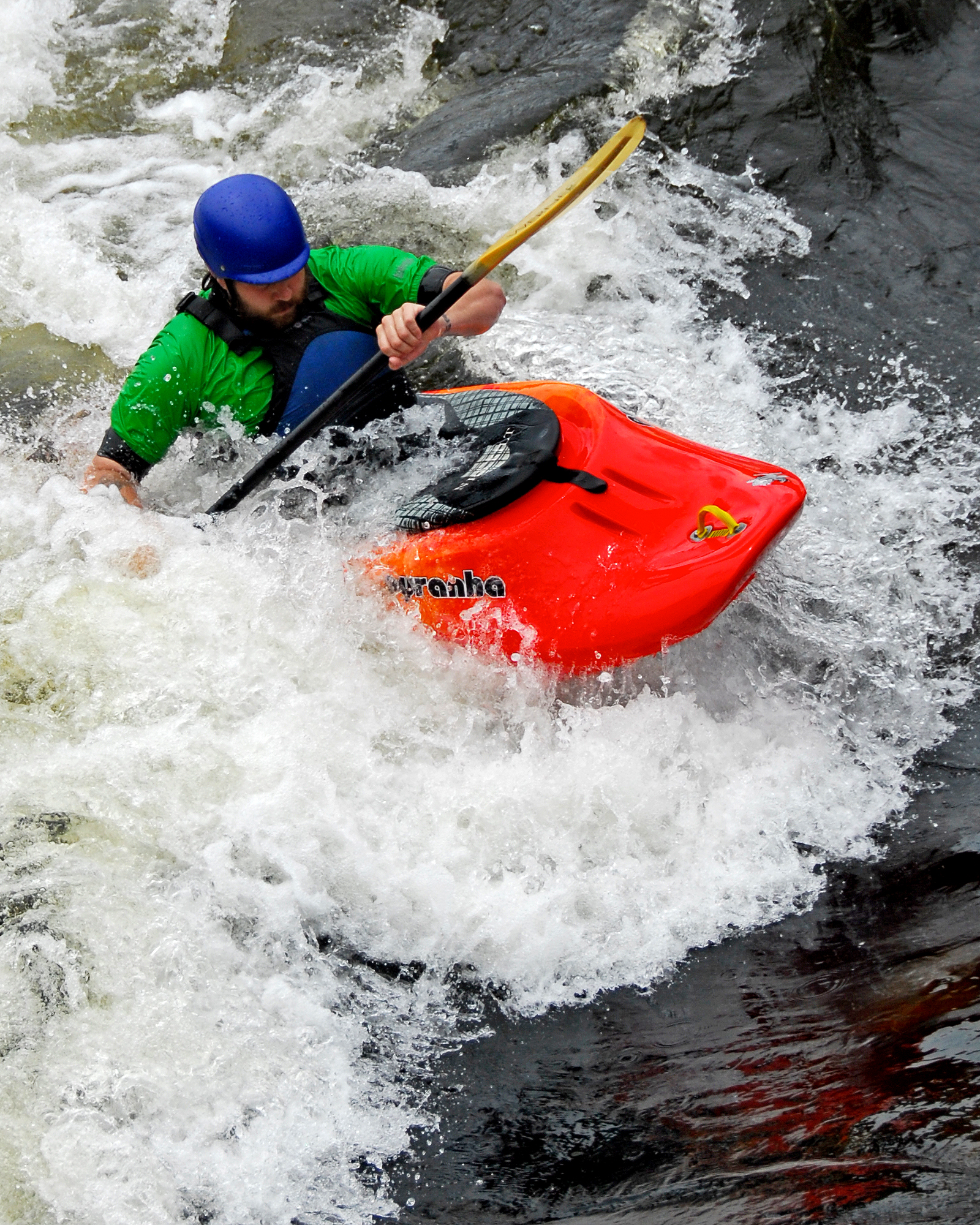
Playboating

- Canoe camping – is a combination of canoeing and camping, similar to backpacking but canoe campers travel by canoes or kayaks
- Canoe sprint – competitive form of canoeing and kayaking on more or less flat water
- Canoe marathon – paddling a canoe or kayak over a long distance to the finish line.
- Canoe polo – competitive ball sport played on water in a defined "field" between two teams of 5 players, each in a kayak
- Canoe sailing – involves fitting a Polynesian outrigger or touring canoe with sails
- Canoe slalom – competitive sport where the aim is to navigate a canoe or kayak through a course of hanging gates on rapids in the fastest time
- Canoe and kayak diving – a type of recreational diving where the divers paddle to a diving site in a canoe or kayak carrying all their gear to the place they want to dive
- Extreme racing – paddling a kayak down a section of hard whitewater requiring excellent boat handling skills. The rivers are typically class V and involve waterfalls and dangerous rapids. Races may involve mass-starts or individual timed runs
- Kayak fishing – fishing from a kayak
- Outrigger canoeing – sport in which an outrigger canoe (vaʼa, waʻa, and waka ama in Tahitian, Hawaiian, and Māori languages, respectively) is propelled by paddles
- Playboating – discipline of whitewater canoeing and kayaking where the paddler performs various technical moves in one place (a playspot)
- Snowkayaking – a winter sport practised by kayaker where the track for the athletes consists of ski tracks in the mountains
- Surf kayaking – the sport of surfing ocean waves with kayaks
- Squirt boating – a form of whitewater canoeing and kayaking where the boat is designed to be as low in volume as possible
- Whitewater canoeing and Whitewater kayaking – sport of paddling respectively a canoe or kayak on a moving body of water, typically river rapids. The term usually applies to a whole trip or run, which has at least some stretches of whitewater included
- Wildwater canoeing – a competitive sport in which canoes and kayaks are used to negotiate a stretch of river speedily

== Canoeing and kayaking equipment ==
=== Canoes and kayaks ===
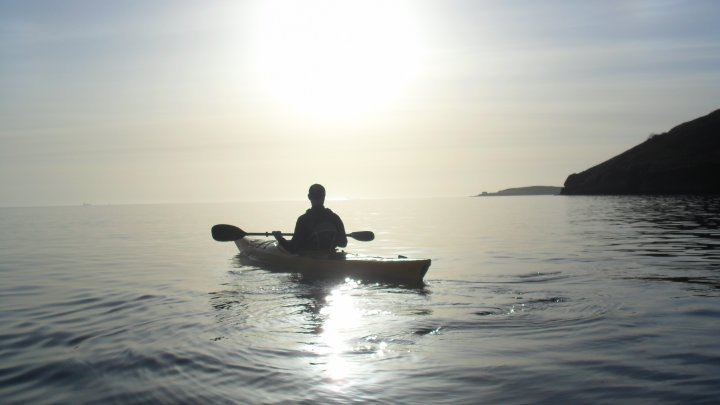
Kayaking on the Helford River

- Canoe (North American English) or "Canadian canoe" (British English) – small boat, pointed at both ends, propelled by paddlers who kneel or sit on a raised seat and use paddles which usually have a blade at one end only. A touring canoe is normally used by two people. A canoe is usually open on top, but can be decked over (i.e. covered, similar to a kayak). A canoe is typically human-powered, though it may also be powered by poling, sails, or a small electric or gas motor. Paddles may be single-bladed or double-bladed.
- Kayak – slim boat, normally pointed at both ends, and usually propelled by one kayaker who sits in a low seat and uses paddles with a blade at each end. Kayaks usually have a covered deck, with a cockpit covered by a spray deck to keep the inside of the boat (and the paddler's lower body) dry.

==== Differences between a canoe and a kayak ====
- Number of blades on the paddle: The easiest way to distinguish between a kayak and a canoe is the number of blades on the paddle. A canoe paddle usually has a single blade on one end, while a kayak paddle is bladed at both ends.
- Sitting position: In a canoe the paddler either kneels on the bottom of the boat or sits on a raised seat. In a kayak the paddler sits on a low seat with their legs extended in front of the body.
- Scope of the name: In some parts of the world, such as the United Kingdom, kayaks are considered a subtype of canoes. Continental European and British canoeing clubs and associations of the 19th Century used craft similar to kayaks, but referred to them as canoes and canoes were then called "Canadian canoes". This explains the naming of the International and National Governing bodies of the sport of Canoeing.

==== Modern designs ====
Materials used in modern designs – modern kayaks are usually made from Rotationally Molded Plastic (Rotomold), Fiberglass or Kevlar, each of which has advantages and disadvantages.

- Rotomold – very durable and ideal for kayaking over rocks; it is the most widely used material and the cheapest.
- Fiberglass – lighter, but requires much more careful handling and is more costly to produce.
- Kevlar – lighter and stronger than fiberglass (it is the same material used in bulletproof vests) but more expensive.
- Royalex – many whitewater canoes are now made using this composite material which has an outer layer of vinyl and ABS with an inner layer of ABS foam, bonded by heat treatment.

Modern canoe/kayak designs – in general, each of the activities mentioned above requires a type of boat specifically designed for that activity.

- Concrete canoe – canoe made of concrete, typically created for an engineering competition similar in spirit to that of a cardboard boat race–make the seemingly unfloatable float.
- Fishing kayak – kayak equipped with after-market accessories such as anchor trolleys, rod holders, electronic fish-finders and live-bait containers for fishing
- Flyak – hydrofoil adaptation to the conventional kayak. It uses twin hydrofoils designed to raise the hull out of the water to increase the speed. Speeds of up to 27.2 km/h (7.6 m/s, 16.9 mph) can be achieved on calm water.
- Folding kayak – kayak with collapsible frame made of some combination of wood, aluminium and plastic, and a skin made of a tough fabric with a waterproof coating
- Inflatable kayak – portable low cost kayak of inflatable polythene
- International Canoe – a high performance sailing canoe with a planing hull, mainsail and a jib
- Malia (Hawaiian canoe) – a Hawaiian-style wooden racing canoe
- Recreational kayak – kayak designed for the casual paddler interested in recreational activities on lakes or flatwater
- Sea kayak – a kayak developed for the sport of paddling on open waters of lakes, bays and the ocean
- Surf kayak - a boat with a surfboard-shaped hull and tail fins, for riding ocean waves and green, non-breaking river waves.
- Sit-on-top kayak – enclosed kayak which is virtually unsinkable, designed for the paddler to sit on top, but which does not keep the paddler warm and dry.
- Sprint canoe – special type of canoe designed for the sport of flatwater canoe racing; it is slim, is paddled while kneeling on one knee, and the paddler does not switch sides.

Whitewater kayak/canoe - most designs are easily converted from kayak (K-1) to canoe (C-1) by changing the seat. The kayak outfitting is the most common.

- Creek Boat - a medium-length, high-volume boat with blunt ends, specialized for steep creeks and waterfalls, for whitewater up to class 6.
- River Runner - a longer, faster, high-volume boat, specialized for class 3 rapids and flatwater sections between rapids.
- Slalom - the fastest possible low-volume design in a 3.5-meter-length maneuvering race boat.
- Freestyle Playboat - the shortest possible, wide, planing-hull (flat-bottomed) boat for surfing and aerial tricks on standing waves and in hydraulic holes. Competitions are scored for difficulty of maneuver.
- Squirt boat - a long, extremely low-volume boat designed to sink below the surface in eddy lines.
- Wildwater race boat - the longest, fastest boat for downriver whitewater racing, very difficult to maneuver.

==== Traditional designs ====
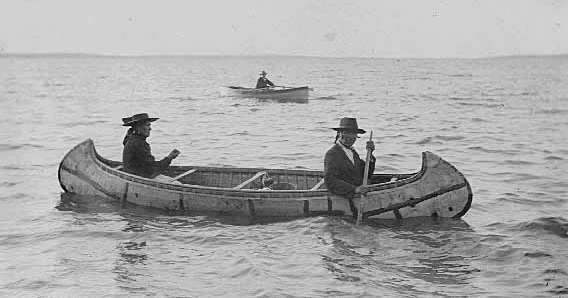
Birch-bark canoe

- Traditional design features
  - Materials used in traditional designs
    - Wooden frame – traditional kayaks and canoes are usually built from a wooden frame, usually western red cedar.
    - Cover – the frames of traditional kayaks and canoes are usually covered with specially treated hide or waterproof material.
- Traditional canoe/kayak designs – most traditional designs are based on centuries of experience of fishing and seal hunting but can be expensive, as they are often hand built to specific requirements.
  - Aleutian kayak – made by the people of the Aleutian Islands primarily from driftwood covered with the seal skins
  - Baidarka – name sometimes used for Aleutian style sea kayak originating from early Russian settlers in Alaska
  - Cayuco – a wooden canoe carved made from the hollowed out trunk of a tree used mainly in South America
  - Chundan Vallam – (Beaked Boat) also known as Kerala snake boats used in boat races
  - Outrigger canoe – canoe with one or more lateral support floats known as outriggers fastened to one or both sides of the main hull
  - Sturgeon-nosed canoe – designed with a reversed prow for use through bulrushes and maneuverability in turbulent waters
  - Taimen – type of folding kayak popular in Russia
  - Umiak – Yupik/Inuit canoe made from driftwood frames pegged and lashed together with covering of walrus or seal skin
  - Waka – Māori canoes ranging from small (waka tīwai) used for fishing and river travel to large decorated war canoes (waka taua) up to 40 metres (130 ft) long
  - War canoe – originally derived from large canoes intended for war, 'war canoes' are now used for racing in Canada

=== Other canoeing and kayaking equipment ===
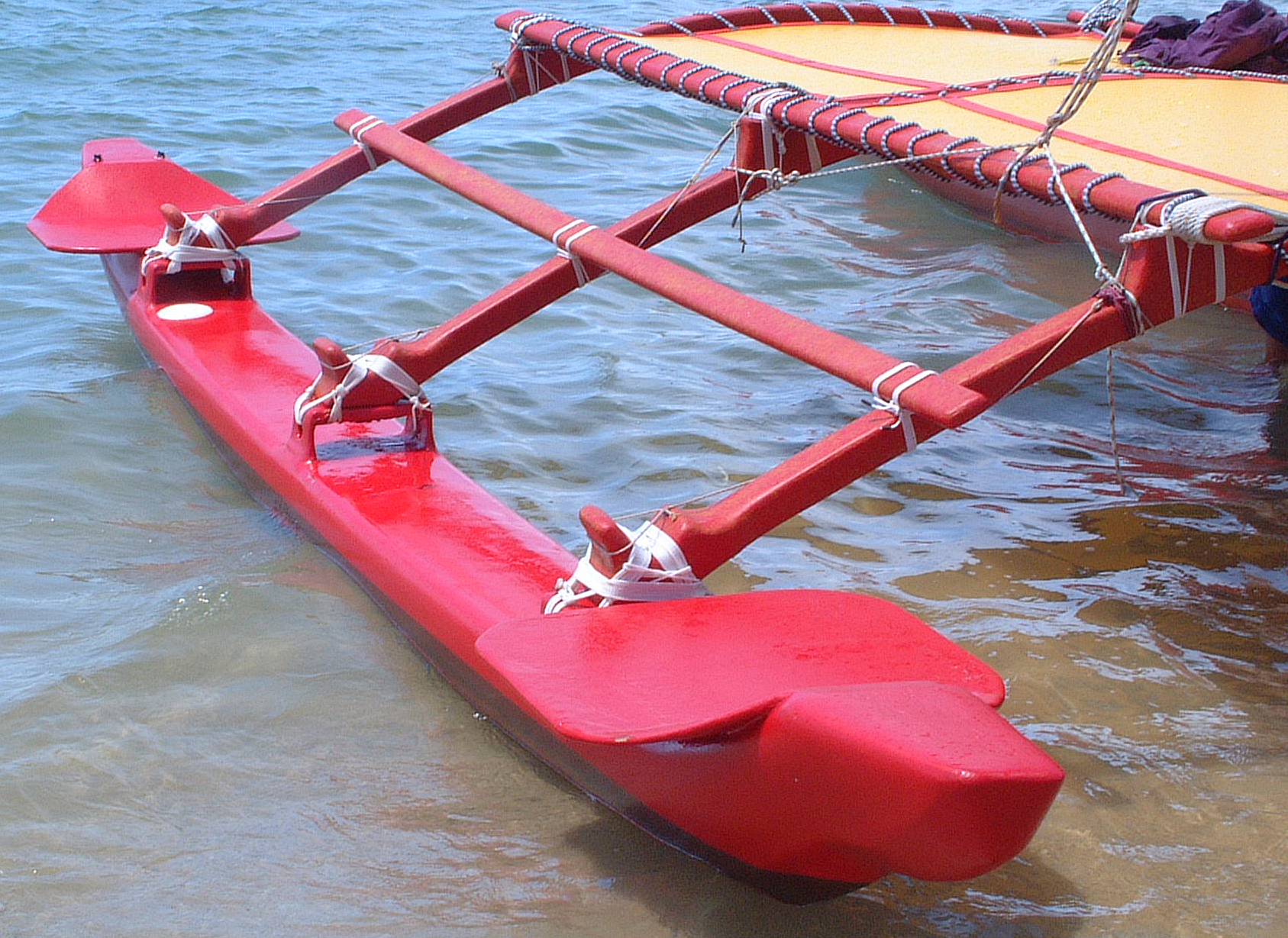
Outrigger on a Hawaiian canoe

- Albano buoy system – a way of marking out kayak, canoe and rowing race courses using lines of buoys
- Buoyancy aid – a specialist form of personal flotation device (PFD) used most commonly by kayakers and canoeists
- Outrigger – a solid hull used to stabilise a canoe and positioned rigidly and parallel to the main hull so that it is less likely to capsize, and to resist heel when sailing.
- Paddle – used in kayaks and canoes for propulsion and made of plastic, wood, fiberglass, carbon fiber or metal. Paddles for use in kayaks are longer, with a blade on each end and are handled from the middle of the shaft
- Paddle float – buoyance aid fitted to paddle used for re-entry into a kayak after a capsize in open water. It may also be used for practice kayak rolling
- Paddle leash – used for securing a paddle especially on solo tours where a paddle may drift away through wind or waves and be lost
- Sea sock – a large waterproof bag placed inside the kayak and attached tightly all around the rim of the cockpit so that the paddler can sit inside and prevent the kayak filling with water during a capsize
- Spray deck – flexible cover for a kayak or a canoe used in whitewater or inclement weather to prevent water from entering the boat while paddling
- Tuilik – a traditional Greenland paddling jacket and spray deck integrated into one piece of clothing, sealed at the face, wrists and around the cockpit coaming

== Canoeing and kayaking techniques ==
An intentionally initiated Kayak Roll

- Eskimo Rescue – manoeuvre performed to recover from a capsize, while grasping another kayak.
- Kayak roll – act of righting a capsized kayak by use of body motion and/or a paddle.
- Portage – carrying watercraft or cargo over land to avoid river obstacles, or to get to another body of water.

== Canoeing and kayaking locations ==
Whitewater – water thrashed around and aerated by the turbulence of a fast enough rapid that some of it turns frothy white.

- Playspot – place where there are favorable stationary features on rivers, in particular standing waves (which may be breaking or partially breaking), 'holes' and 'stoppers', where water flows back on itself creating a retentive feature (these are often formed at the bottom of small drops or weirs), or eddy lines (the boundary between slow moving water at the rivers' edge, and faster water).
- Rapids – fast flowing section of a river.

Artificial whitewater courses – special sites usually for competition or commercial use where water is diverted or pumped over a concrete watercourse to simulate a range of different water situations that can be controlled consistently Whitewater rivers – rivers with one or more stretches of whitewater rapids.

=== Specific venues ===
- Boundary Waters Canoe Area Wilderness – wilderness area within the Superior National Forest in northeastern Minnesota (USA) under the administration of the U.S. Forest Service. The BWCAW is renowned as a destination for both canoeing and fishing on its many lakes and is the most visited wilderness in the United States.
- Cardiff International White Water – Olympic standard white water rafting centre based at the Cardiff International Sports Village in Cardiff Bay. The centre offers on-demand white water rafting and canoeing and a flat-water pond for warm-up and initial training.
- Canolfan Tryweryn – National White Water Centre for Wales, and is based near Bala in North Wales. It developed the first commercial white water rafting operation in the UK in 1986, and since then has grown to become the largest and most well-respected rafting organisation in the UK.
- Cardington Artificial Slalom Course – first artificial whitewater canoe slalom course in the UK when it was completed in July 1982, having been first discussed in 1972.
- River Dart – a river in Devon, England which rises high on Dartmoor, and releases to the sea at Dartmouth. The upper reaches of Dartmoor, especially those on the Dart, are a focal point for whitewater kayakers and canoeists. Sections of the river include:
  - Upper Dart – from Dartmeet to Newbridge (Grade 3/4 (higher in high water), advanced run).
  - The Loop – from Newbridge to Holne Bridge (Grade 2/3, beginner/intermediate run).
  - The Lower – from Holne Bridge to Buckfastleigh (Grade 2, beginner section).
- Dickerson Whitewater Course – built on the Potomac River near Dickerson Maryland for use by canoe and kayak paddlers training for the 1992 Olympic Games in Spain. It was the first pump-powered artificial whitewater course built in North America, and is still the only one (as of June 2015) anywhere with heated water.
- Dorney Lake – purpose-built rowing lake in England, privately owned by Eton College. It is near the village of Dorney, Buckinghamshire, and is 2.2 kilometres (1.4 miles) long.
- Dutch Water Dreams – Olympic artificial whitewater and surfing centre, near Zoetermeer in The Netherlands. It is the only course of its kind in the country.

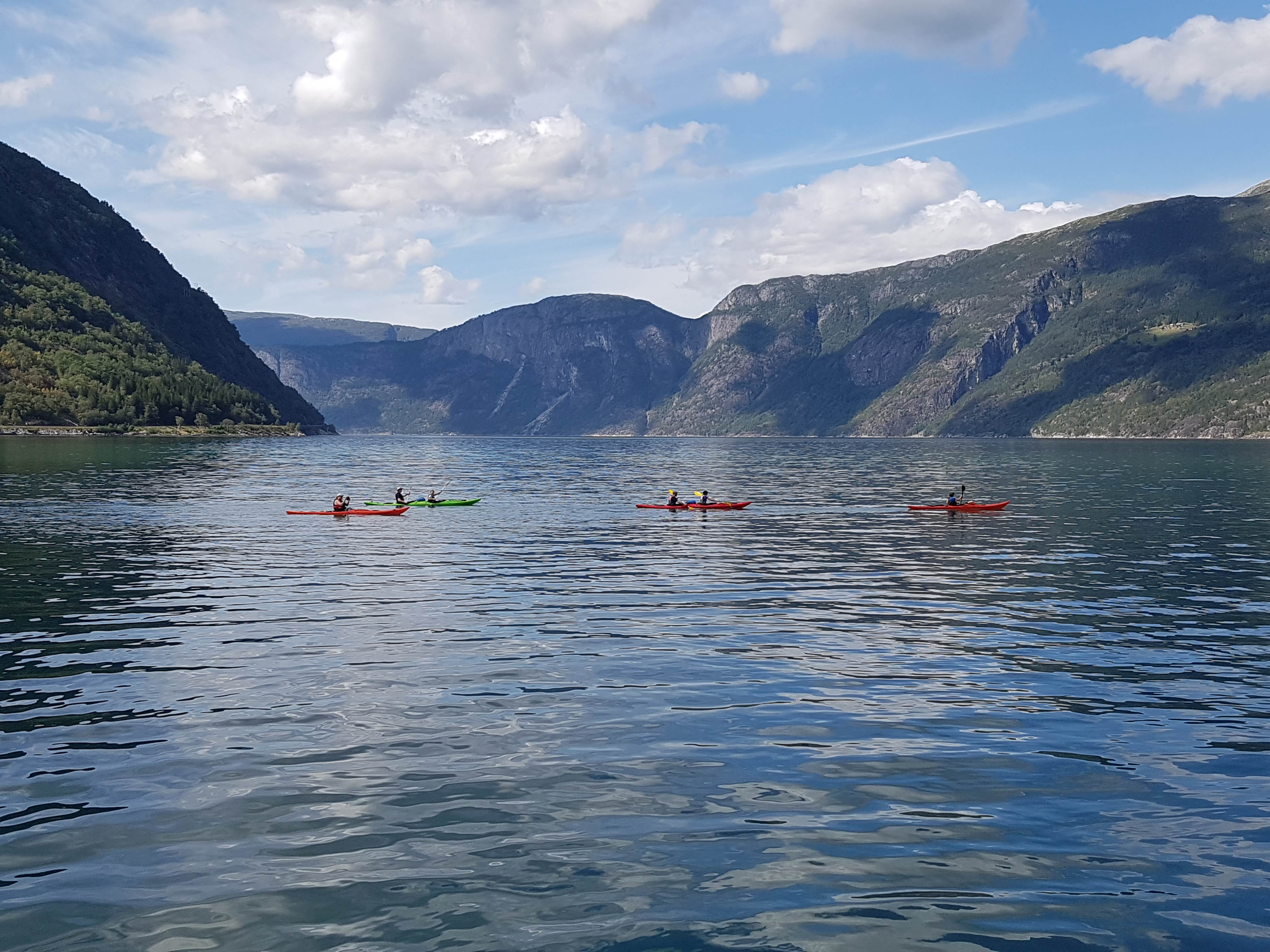
Kayakers at Eid Fjord, Norway

- Eiskanal – artificial whitewater river in Augsburg, Germany, constructed as the canoe slalom venue for the 1972 Summer Olympics in nearby Munich.
- Hawaii-sur-Rhone – freestyle kayaking venue and natural standing wave on the River Rhône.
- Helliniko Olympic Canoe/Kayak Slalom Centre – located in the Hellinicon Olympic Complex in Greece, it includes a competition course, secondary training course, and a warm-up lake of natural form, that occupies a total area of 27,000 square metres. It hosted the canoe slalom events for the 2004 Summer Olympics.
- Holme Pierrepont National Watersports Centre – a focal point for English whitewater rafting and kayaking, often holding international events for slalom, freestyle and wild water racing. The whitewater course is located between the weir on the canalised River Trent and the regatta lake.
- Idroscalo –
- Kanupark Markkleeberg –
- Kasai Canoe Slalom Centre –
- Lee Valley White Water Centre –
- Millrace Rapids –
- Nene Whitewater Centre –
- Northern Forest Canoe Trail – a 740-mile (1,190 km) wilderness canoe trail located in the northeastern United States and Canada, stretching from Old Forge, New York to Fort Kent, Maine. It is a long-distance trail often completed in sections rather than "through-paddles". Sights on the trail include the Adirondack Mountains.
- Ocoee Whitewater Center – the venue of the 1996 Summer Olympics canoe slalom competition and the only in-river Olympic slalom course. The 1,640-foot (500 m) course is watered on weekends throughout the summer season and used by guided rafts and private boaters.
- Ohio River Trail –
- Parc Olímpic del Segre –
- Penrith Whitewater Stadium –
- Račice, Czech Republic –
- Rutherford Creek –
- Saint Regis Canoe Area –
- Shunyi Olympic Rowing-Canoeing Park –
- South Bend –, Indiana
- Stanley whitewater canoeing course –
- Symonds Yat Rapids –
- Tacen Whitewater Course –
- Teesside White Water Course –
- Texas Water Safari –
- River Thames – very popular river for kayakers and canoeists, and home to several canoe clubs, including the Royal Canoe Club (oldest canoe club in the world).
  - Hurley Lock – lock and weir on the River Thames in England, situated in a clump of wooded islands close to the village of Hurley, Berkshire.
  - Boulter's Lock – lock and weir on the Thames River in England. A canoe/kayak flume is installed annually on the weir during the summer and there is a permanent fixed ramp in front of the third of the weir's six gates.
- Tour de Gudenå –
- U.S. National Whitewater Center –
- Upper Dart –
- Water Sports Centre Čunovo –
- Welland International Flatwater Centre-
- Wisconsin River –
- Wolf River (Tennessee) –

== Canoeing and kayaking competitions ==
- Canoeing and kayaking at the Summer Olympics
- Canoeing at the Asian Games – events contested at every Asian Games since 1990 Asian Games in Beijing
- Adirondack Canoe Classic – also known as the 90-miler, is a three-day, 90-mile (140 km) canoe race from Old Forge to Saranac Lake in the Adirondacks of New York, USA
- Backwaters Paddle Quest – a canoe-based sprint held annually in Stevens Point, WI on the Wisconsin River
- Breede River Canoe Marathon – an annual South African K2 (doubles) race down the Breede River from Robertson to Swellendam in the Western Cape over a distance of 75 km
- Berg River Canoe Marathon – takes place annually in South Africa's Western Cape Province over a distance of some 240 km from Paarl to the small harbour of Velddrif on the West Coast
- Devizes to Westminster International Canoe Marathon – a marathon canoe race in England held every Easter over a course of 125 miles (201 kilometres) from Devizes in Wiltshire to Westminster in central London.
- Dusi Canoe Marathon – a canoe (or rather, kayak) race between Pietermaritzburg and Durban, South Africa, run along the Msunduzi River (commonly referred to as the Dusi or Duzi)
- Fish River Canoe Marathon – a two-day event taking place every October on South Africa's Fish River in the Eastern Cape Province over a distance of some 81 km
- ICF Canoe Sprint World Championships & ICF Canoe Slalom World Championships – two international events in canoeing organised by the International Canoe Federation
- Texas Water Safari – a trek down waterways from San Marcos, Texas, to Seadrift, Texas

== History of canoeing and kayaking ==
- History of canoeing
  - History of the canoe
    - History of the outrigger canoe
  - History of canoe camping
  - History of canoe polo
- History of kayaking
  - History of the kayak
    - History of the folding kayak
    - History of the sea kayak
  - History of kayak fishing
  - History of whitewater kayaking

== Canoeing and kayaking organisations ==
- Royal Canoe Club - founded in 1866, the oldest canoe club in the world
- International Canoe Federation – (ICF) the umbrella organization of all national canoe organizations worldwide and administers all aspects of canoe sport.
- American Canoe Association – (ACA) is the largest paddle sports organization in the US.
- American Whitewater - (AWA) the primary advocate for the preservation and protection of whitewater resources throughout the United States.
- USACK – the USA Canoe and Kayak National Governing Body for the Olympic sports of Flatwater Sprint and Whitewater Slalom.
- British Canoeing – the National Governing Body for the sport of canoeing and kayaking in the UK (renamed from BCU)
  - Canoe Wales – the national governing body for paddle sport in Wales
  - Canoe England - the national governing body to support the development of canoeing in England
  - Scottish Canoe Association – (SCA) the governing body for canoeing and kayaking in Scotland.
  - Canoe Association of Northern Ireland - (CANI) the governing body for canoeing and kayaking in Northern Ireland
- Canadian Canoe Association – governing body of competitive canoeing and kayaking disciplines in Canada.

== Canoeing and kayaking museums ==
- Canadian Canoe Museum - Peterborough, Ontario
- Wisconsin Canoe Heritage Museum - Spooner, Wisconsin

== Notable canoeists and kayakers ==
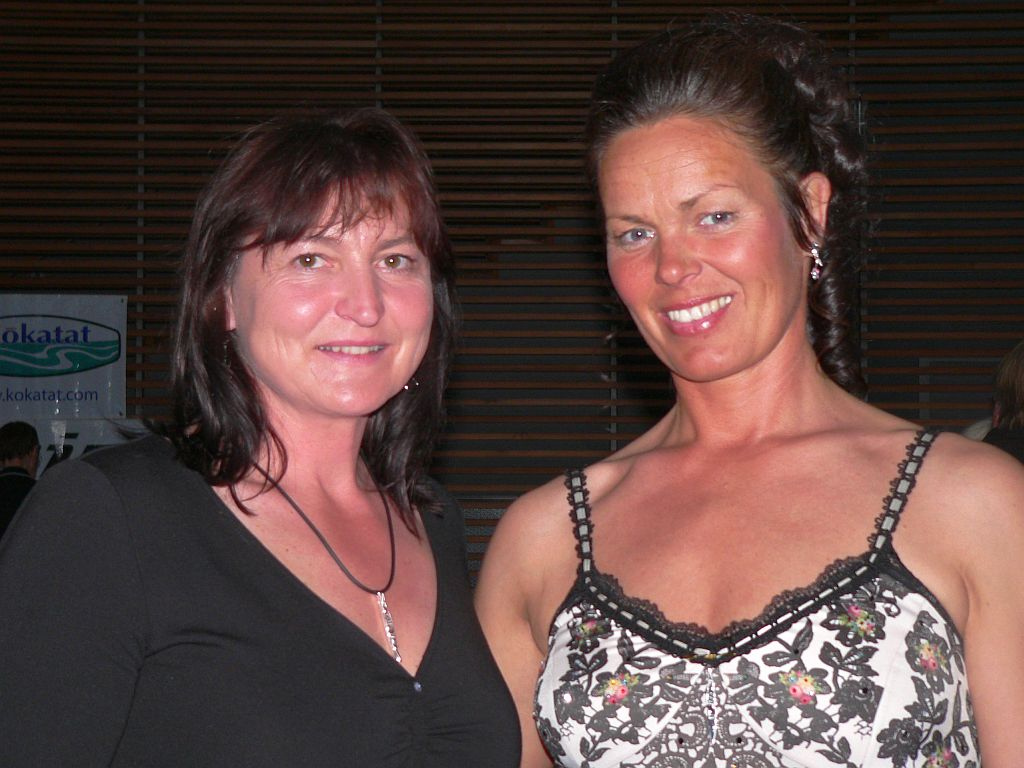
Birgit Fischer (left) with Freya Hoffmeister

=== Voyagers and adventurers ===
- Paul Caffyn – New Zealand sea kayaker has completed a number of supported, unsupported, solo and group expeditions by sea kayak in various locations around the world
- Aleksander Doba – Polish kayaker notable for Atlantic Crossings
- Chris Duff – American expedition sea kayaker notable for his large-scale projects and world-record breaking attempts. Since 1983, he has kayaked over 14,000 miles.
- Nigel Foster – first and youngest paddler to circumnavigate Iceland 1977, first solo crossing of Hudson Strait from Baffin Island to Northern Labrador 1981
- Freya Hoffmeister – German woman who holds several sea kayaking endurance records and in 2009 was the first woman to complete a circumnavigation of Australia solo and unassisted,
- Hannes Lindemann – German Doctor notable for several Atlantic crossings, mainly for Sea Survival research.
- John MacGregor - Scottish explorer, travel writer and philanthropist. Popularising canoeing as a sport in the late 19th century
- Andrew McAuley – was an Australian adventurer best known for sea kayaking in remote parts of the world who is presumed to have died following his disappearance at sea while attempting to kayak 1600 km across the Tasman Sea in February 2007
- Alex Prostko – American whitewater kayaker who made the first legal descent of Section I of the Chattooga River in over 30 years.
- Helen Skelton – kayaked the entire length of the River Amazon for Sport Relief in 2010
- Oskar Speck – was a German canoeist who paddled by folding kayak from Germany to Australia over the period 1932–1939

=== Olympic medalists ===
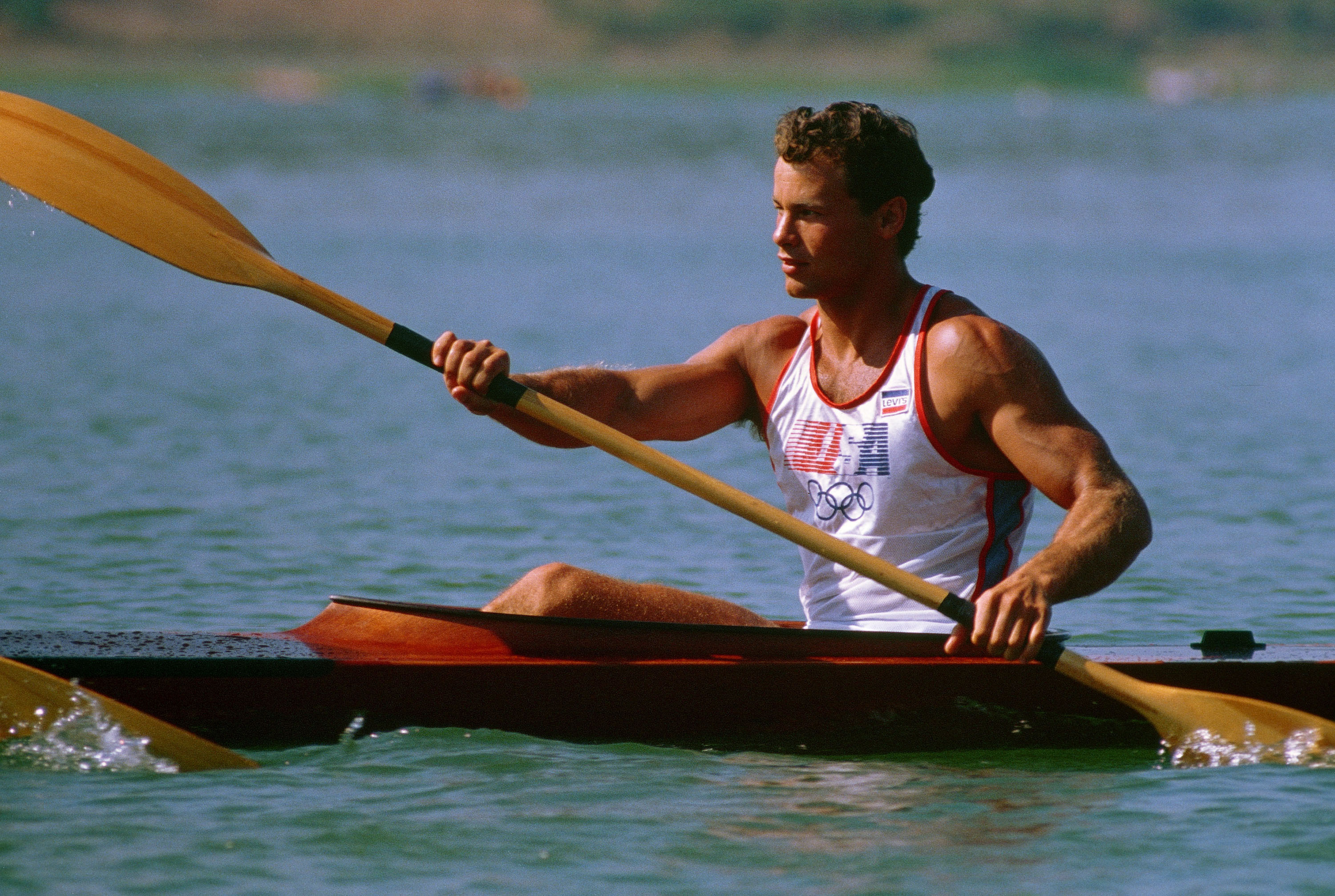
Daniel W. Schnurrenberger at the 1984 Summer Olympics

==== Australian ====
- Jessica Fox - three-time Olympic gold medalist

==== Canadian ====
- Frank Amyot – Canadian Olympic gold medalist
- Caroline Brunet – Canadian Olympic silver and bronze medalist
- Larry Cain – Canadian Olympic gold and silver medalist
- David Ford – Canadian Olympic slalom canoeist who has competed since the early 1990s
- Hugh Fisher – Canadian Olympic gold and bronze medalist
- Steve Giles – Canadian Olympic bronze medalist
- Thomas Hall – Canadian Olympic bronze medalist
- Sue Holloway – Canadian Olympic silver and bronze medalist
- Adam van Koeverden – Canadian Olympic gold, silver and bronze medalist
- Alwyn Morris – Canadian Olympic gold and bronze medalist

==== German ====
- Birgit Fischer – German kayaker who has won eight gold medals over six different Olympic Games

==== Other ====
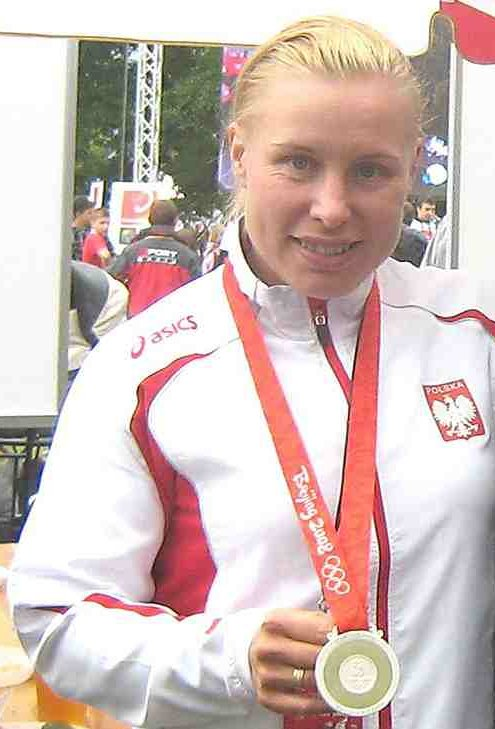
Aneta Konieczna

- Gábor Horváth – Hungarian sprint canoer who competed in three Summer Olympics
- Eric Jackson – world-champion freestyle kayaker and kayak designer
- Jan Johansen – Norwegian sprint canoer who won a gold medal at the 1968 Summer Olympics in Mexico
- György Kolonics – Hungarian sprint canoer who won four Olympic medals in Canadian and record 29 ICF Canoe Sprint World Championships in Canadian discipline.
- Aneta Konieczna – Polish sprint canoer who won three Olympic medals in the K-2 500 m event with one silver (2008 and two bronzes (2000, 2004)
- Katalin Kovács – Hungarian sprint canoer. Winner of six Olympic medals and a record-tying (with Birgit Fischer) 38 ICF Canoe Sprint World Championships medals.
- Carlos Pérez – Galician sprint canoer who a gold medal in the Beijing Olympics in 2008
- Anna Wood – Dutch-born Australian sprint canoer who competed from the early 1980s to the early 2000s in four Summer Olympics and won two bronze medals
- Clay Wright – professional whitewater kayaker and kayak designer

=== ICF Canoe Sprint World Championships medalists ===
- List of ICF Canoe Sprint World Championships medalists in men's Canadian
- List of ICF Canoe Sprint World Championships medalists in men's kayak
- List of ICF Canoe Sprint World Championships medalists in women's kayak
- List of ICF Canoe Sprint World Championships medalists in paracanoe

== See also ==
- Outline of sports
