= Playspot =

Favorable location for kayaking

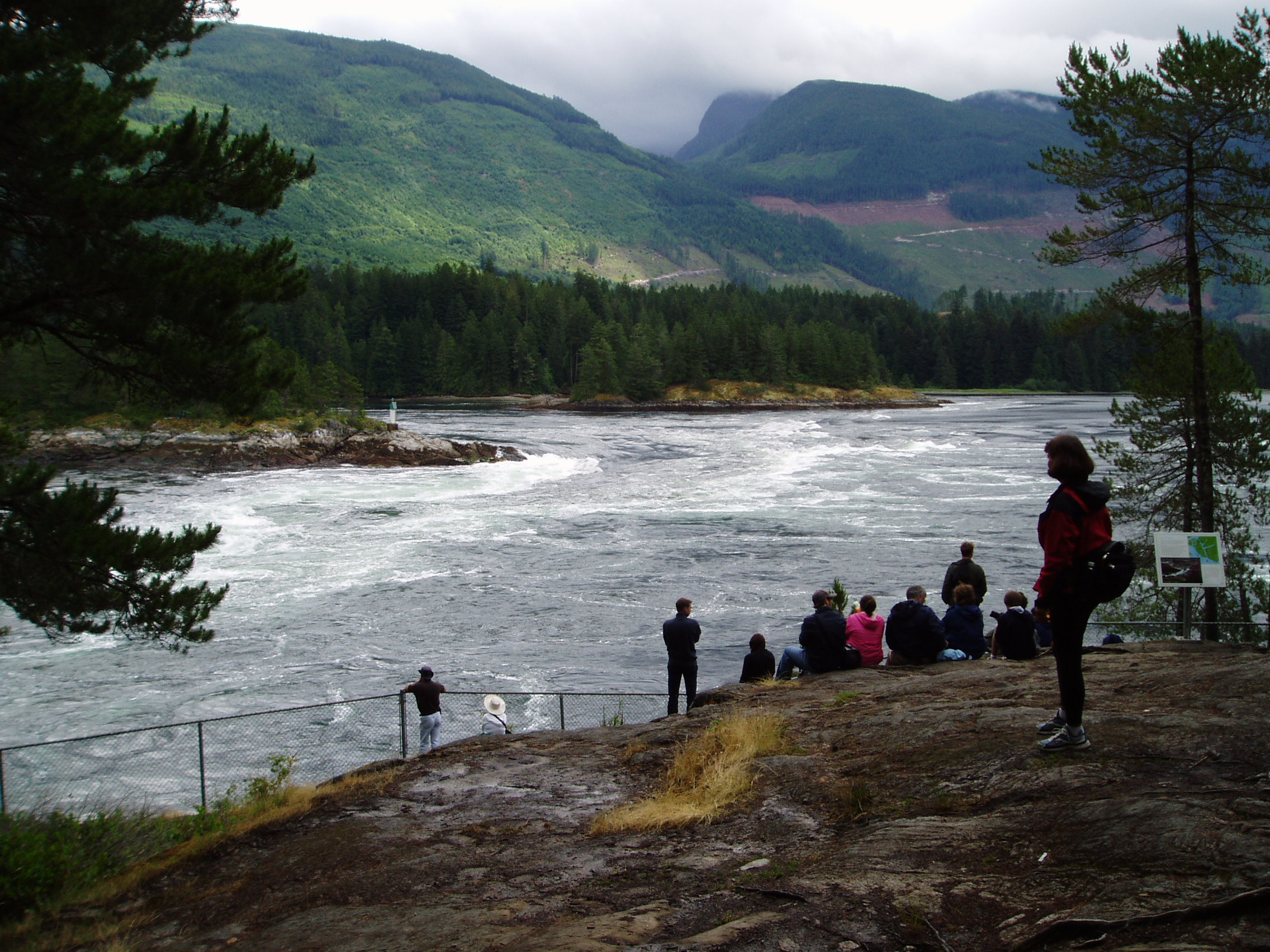
Skookumchuck Narrows during a strong ebb tide

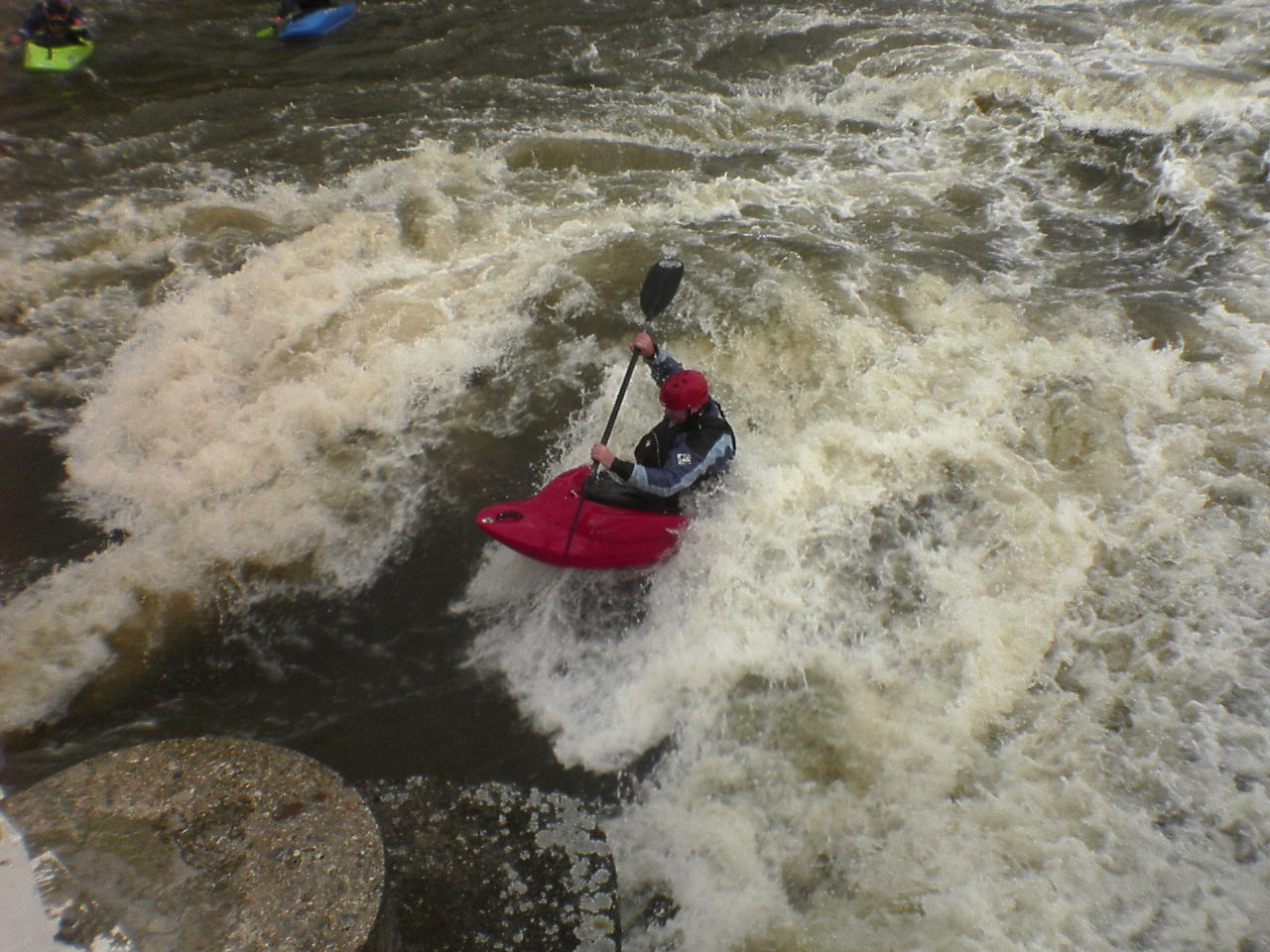
Hurley Weir

Kayakers playboating on Falls of Lora

In kayaking, a playspot is a place where there are favorable stationary features on rivers, in particular standing waves (which may be breaking or partially breaking), 'holes' and 'stoppers', where water flows back on itself creating a retentive feature (these are often formed at the bottom of small drops or weirs), or eddy lines (the boundary between slow moving water at the rivers' edge, and faster water).

Playspots exist both in natural and artificial whitewater.

== Playboating ==
Playboating is sometimes performed on dynamic moving features such as haystacks (large boils) and whirlpools, or on flat water (this is often referred to as flatwheeling). Playspots are found on natural whitewater, on artificial weirs, on artificial whitewater courses, and occasionally on tidal races in the sea.

== Popular Playspots ==
=== Natural year-round playspots ===
Europe

- The Rabioux wave on the Durance in France
- Hawaii-sur-Rhône on the Rhône River, in Lyon, France

North America

- Lunch Counter on the Snake River in Wyoming
- Hell Hole on the Ocoee River in Tennessee
- Rock Island State Park in the Cumberland Mountains of Tennessee
- School House Rock "KRH" playhole in California
- Zoar Gap rapid on the Deerfield River near Charlemont, Massachusetts
- Kananaskis River in Alberta, Canada

Further natural year-round playspots

- Kaituna "bottom Hole" Rotorua, New Zealand

=== High volume rivers ===
Many high-volume rivers are often run for their playspots:

Africa

- The White Nile in Uganda
- The Zambezi in Zambia

North America

- The Slave River in Canada
- Mini Bus, Big Bus, Gladiator, and Garburator on The Ottawa River in Canada
- The Lachine Rapids in Quebec
- Wave-o-Saurus on the Connecticut River in Holyoke, Massachusetts

=== Weirs ===
- Hurley Weir on the Thames, near London
- Sluice on River Liffey, Lucan, Dublin, Ireland
- Shrewsbury, Shropshire Weir on the River Severn

=== Man-enhanced playspots ===
==== Europe ====
- Terminator Wave, Erzherzog-Johann-Brücke, Graz, Austria
- Almwelle, Almkanal, Salzburg, Austria
- Eisbach, Munich, Germany

==== North America ====
- The Gutter on the Payette River in Horseshoe Bend, Idaho
- The U.S. National Whitewater Center in Charlotte, North Carolina
- The Salida playhole in Colorado
- The Golden Kayak Park in Golden, Colorado
- The Lower Saluda River in Columbia, SC. Specifically, Millrace Rapids near the Riverbanks Zoo
- Rio Vista Park on the San Marcos River in San Marcos, Texas
- Slumber Falls on the Guadalupe River near New Braunfels, Texas
- 'Heavy D', or 'The Ruins' in the deschenes on the Ottawa River in Ottawa, Ontario

=== Tidal races ===
Europe

- The Bitches in Wales
- The Swellies on the Menai Strait, Wales
- The Falls of Lora in Scotland
- The Arches, Malahide Estuary in Dublin, Ireland
- Clifden Hole, Clifden, County Galway, Ireland

North America

- Skookumchuck Narrows in Canada
- Cohasset Tidal Rip in Cohasset, Massachusetts
- Sheepscot Reversing Falls in Newcastle, Maine

=== Others ===
The Tryweryn in Wales, the Dee near Llangollen in Wales, the Washburn in England, and Hambledon Weir on the Thames have been modified (by moving boulders on the river bed, or in the case of Hambledon by installing pneumatic kicker ramps on the river bed) to create better playspots.

Construction has been completed on Brennan's Wave a project in Missoula, USA, that is converting a broken diversion dam into a playpark for kayakers.
