= Kayaking (disambiguation) =

Kayaking is a form of propulsion of boats and other watercraft.

Kayaking may also refer to:

== Watersport ==
- Canoe slalom, the olympic sport where kayaks are raced through a course of gates in white water
- Canoe sprint, the olympic sport where kayaks are raced over a short distance on flat water
- Canoe marathon, racing over a long distance on flat water
- Wildwater canoeing, racing on white water
- Canoe polo, ball game played in kayaks on flat water
- Surfski, kayak racing in the ocean
- Sea kayak, recreational kayaking on the sea
- Canoe freestyle, technical moves performed in a kayak
- Creeking, kayaking in extreme rapids
- Surf kayaking, surfing with kayaks
- Squirt boating, technical manoeuvres performed in both surface and underwater currents

== See also ==
- Paddling
