= Canoeing South Africa =

Governing body for canoeing and kayaking

- Sport: Canoeing; Kayaking
- Jurisdiction: South Africa
- Abbreviation: CSA
- Founded: 1956
- Affiliation: International Canoe Federation
- Regional affiliation: African Canoe Confederation
- President: Kim Pople
- Secretary: Colin Simpkins

Official website
- www.canoesa.org.za
- (South Africa)

Canoeing South Africa is the governing body for the sport of canoeing and kayaking in South Africa.The body is affiliated to the International Canoe Federation (ICF) and the African Canoe Confederation.

== History ==
There seems to be no record of canoeing on the rivers of Southern Africa before the 1930s. By the 1930s, canoe trips were made on rivers like the Orange River and the Vaal River, with the first canoe race on record being made on the Vaal River in 1939.

In 1951 the inaugural Dusi Canoe Marathon, was held, the South African Canoe Federation (SACF) was then established in 1956 to govern the sport of canoe racing. Around the 1960s, kayaks made of fibreglass were introduced, and the sport started expanding. During the same period, Willem van Riet began several river races, beginning with a solo descent of the Orange River: he navigated from Aliwal North westwards to the sea at Oranjemund within 36 days. He then made subsequent trips with descents of the Limpopo River, the Sabie River and later, along with his friend Gordon Rowe, the Cunene River.

In the 1970s, plastic kayaks made their appearance, creating a revolution in kayaking. The understanding of white-water hydraulics grew very fast and waterfalls were being run safely. Commercial river-running also appeared on the scene, with Graeme Addison involved in organising trips for clients using kayaks and rafts, prior to his creation of South Africa’s first commercial operator “The River Men” in 1983. Economic focus later changed in favour of rafting. Graeme Addison in addition, started the Southern African Rivers’ Association (SARA).

== See also ==
- Berg River Canoe Marathon
- Breede River Canoe Marathon
- Dusi Canoe Marathon
- Fish River Canoe Marathon
