= The Bitches =

Tidal rapid in Wales

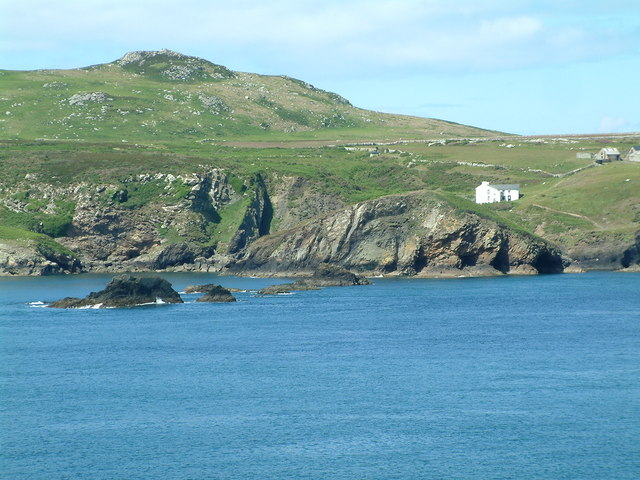
- The Bitches in 2007, with Ramsey Island beyond

- Location within Wales

Geography
- Location: St Brides Bay
- Coordinates: 51°51′42″N 5°20′34″W

Administration
- Wales
- County: Pembrokeshire

The Bitches (also known as Bitches and Whelps) are a tidal race and set of rocks between Ramsey Island and the west Welsh coastline near St Davids. They are a popular tourist destination and a playspot for extreme waterboarding enthusiasts such as whitewater kayakers and surfers.

== Name and history ==
The Bitches supposedly derives its name from at least 1909, when a steamer was holed on the rock but managed to beach before she sank. The following year three lifeboatmen were drowned aiding a ketch foundered on the rocks.

== Formation ==
Water between Ramsey Island and the Welsh coastline is squeezed over a sea bed that changes height dramatically. During the change of tides this causes the water to flow at a rate of up to 7 knots (13 km/h). A set of rocks further constricts the water, especially during higher tides, and this causes hydraulics to form in the shape of glassy standing waves and broken waves (also known as stoppers).

== Access ==
Numerous guidebooks detail the route to The Bitches, but it is not for the inexperienced or unprepared. The Bitches can be treacherous. Not only are the fast flows and hydraulics a danger, but a large underwater spire known as Horse Rock causes boils and whirlpools, which have sunk boats in the past.
