= Canadian (canoe) =

Byname for canoe

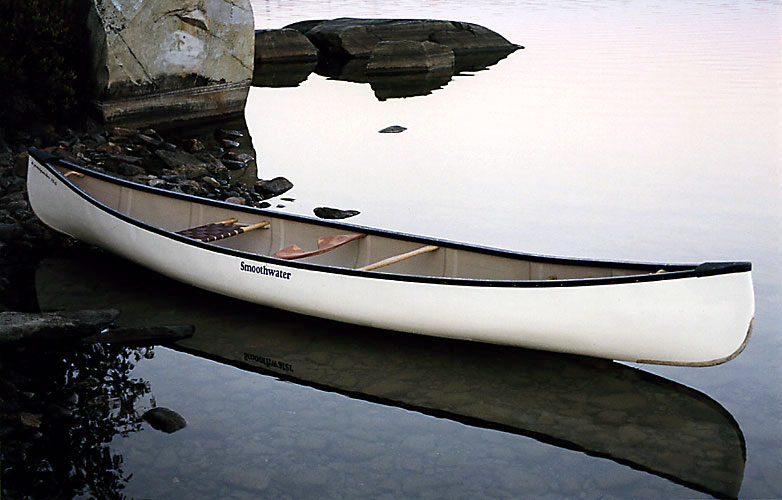
Touring canoe

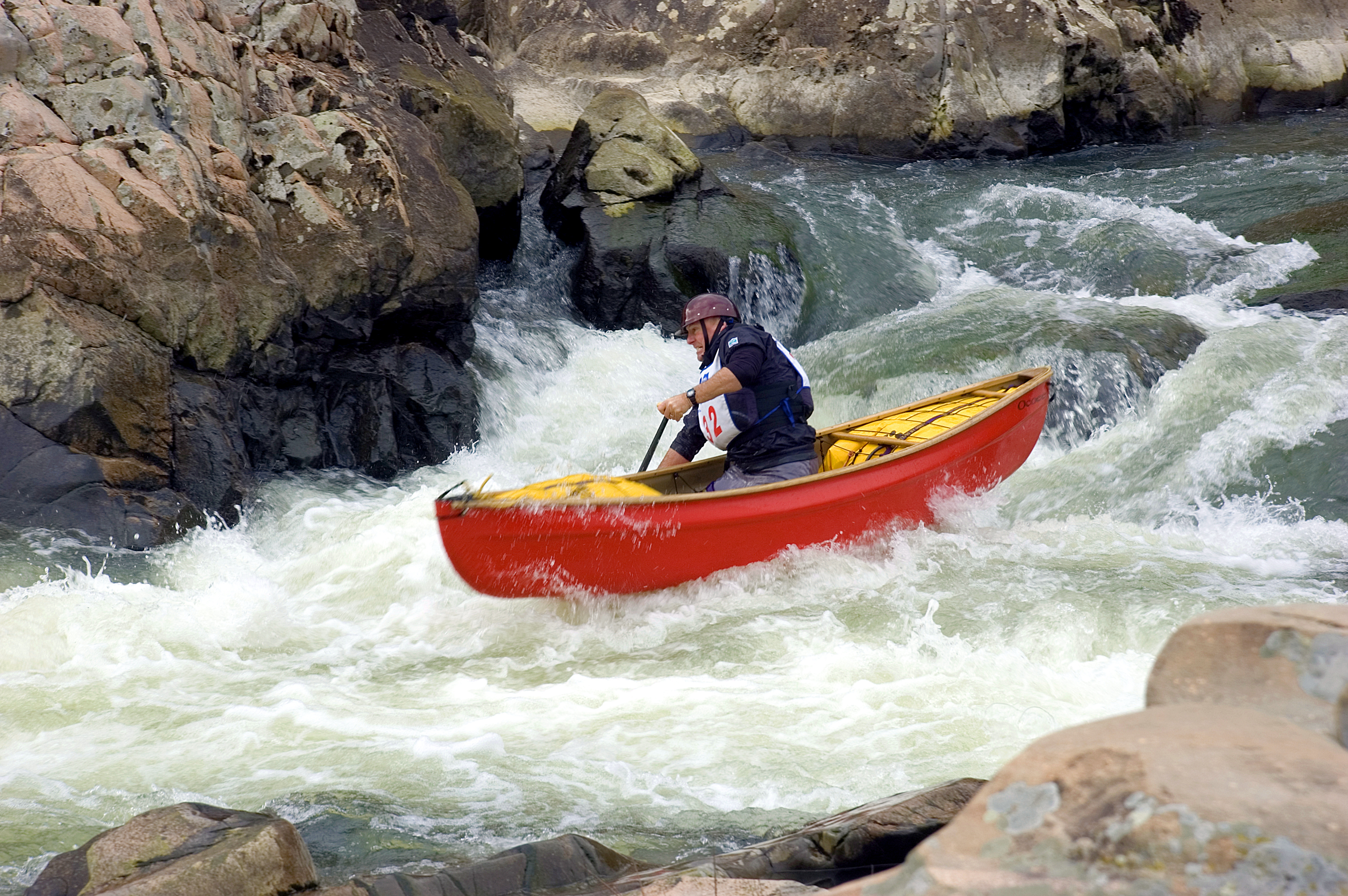
Whitewater canoe

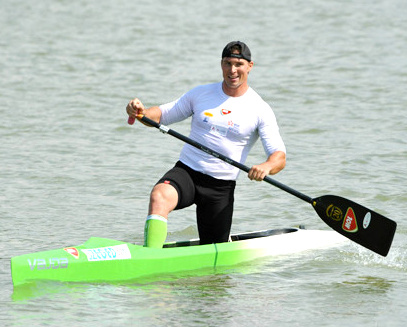
Racing canoe

Canadian is the byname used in some countries for the descendants of the birch bark canoe that was used by the indigenous peoples of Northern America as a convenient means of transportation in the densely forested and impassable areas of Northern America.

In the United Kingdom and several other European countries the kayak is considered to be a kind of canoe. (Technically this is understandable, as one can easily see when a whitewater kayak is converted into a decked whitewater canoe just by taking the seat out and paddle it kneeling with a single blade paddle.) To distinguish canoes from kayaks, a touring, whitewater and racing canoe are then often called 'Canadian canoe' or 'Canadian' for short — e.g. Kanadier in German, Kanadensare in Swedish, Canadees in Dutch, et cetera.

== History ==
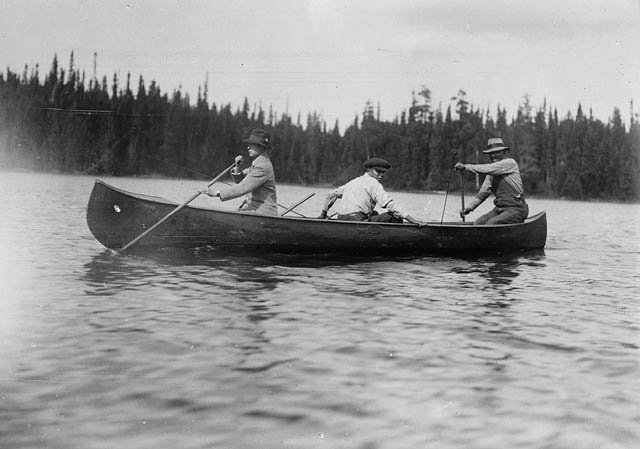
'Canadian style' canoe

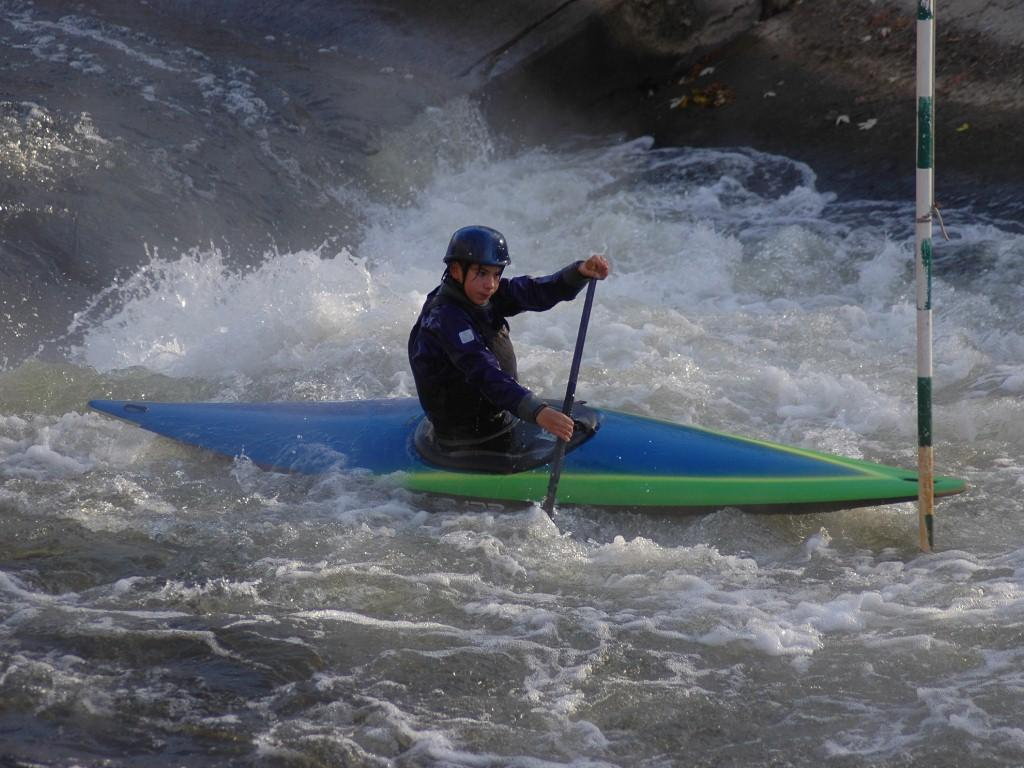
Decked whitewater canoe

The use of the byname 'Canadian' is the result of misinterpretations during the development of the sport of canoeing in the 19th century when an open touring canoe was called 'Canadian canoe' from the so called Canadian style canoe from Canada, the then more or less 'approved' open touring canoe by the American Canoe Association (ACA), as opposed to the wood-and-canvas touring canoe from Maine in the United States that was not officially recognized by the ACA until 1934.

For the canoeing clubs and associations of the late 19th century a canoe was a decked, double-ended boat, propelled with a double-blade paddle or sailed. At that time those organizations for large part consisted of somewhat elitist [wealthy] people with the opinion that one should be able to sail well with a touring canoe. (Note: With the adage "Sail if you can, paddle if you must.") Therefore, from the open canoes only the cedar-rib 'Canadian style' canoe was approved by them. The birchbark canoe was considered inferior and its direct descendant the wood-and-canvas canoe "a rag canoe, only suitable for workmen and primitive natives" [sic]. The wood-and-canvas canoe was however easier to manufacture and maintain than a cedar-rib canoe and therefore less expensive, which made it much more popular.

In America the canoe lost its qualifying prefix 'Canadian' not long afterwards. In several European countries though, people were not aware of these discrepancies and continued calling all kind of canoes 'Canadians' — even the decked whitewater canoes and, ironically, the wood-and-canvas canoe...

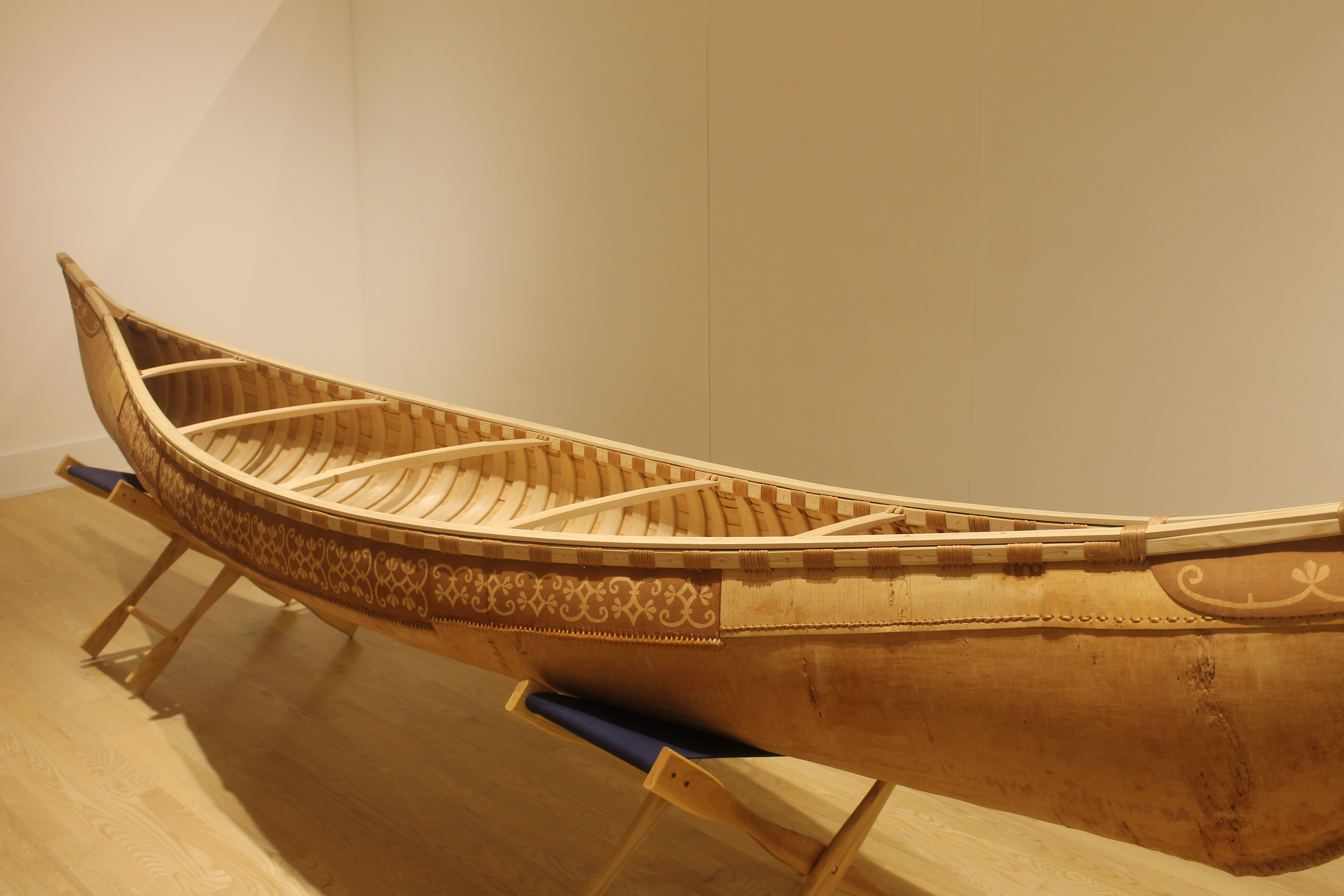
Birchbark canoe

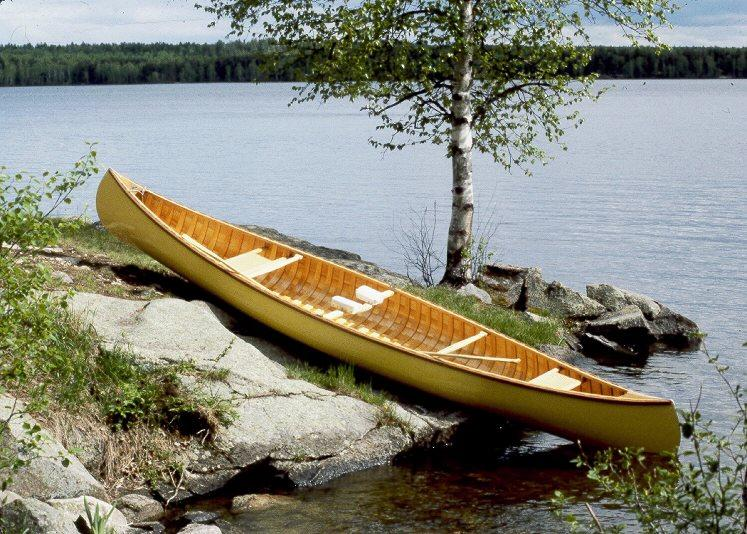
Wood-and-canvas canoe

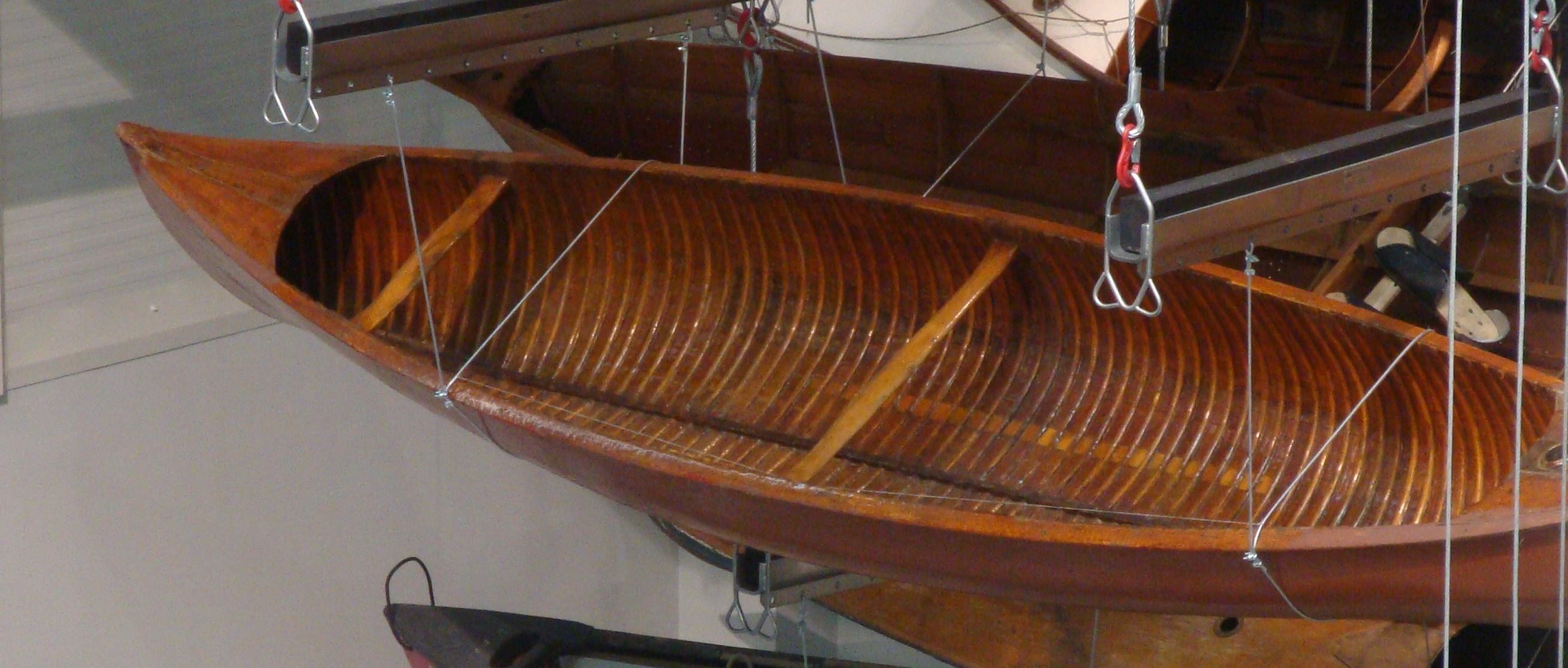
Cedar-rib canoe

== See also ==
- Outline of Canoeing and Kayaking
- John MacGregor

== General References ==
Manley, Atwood (1988). Rushton and His Times in American Canoeing. Syracuse University Press. ISBN 0-8156-0141-7.

Moores, Ted; Mohr, Merilyn (2001). Canoecraft, An Illustrated Guide to Fine Woodstrip Construction. Firefly Books Ltd. pp. 8–19. ISBN 0-920656-24-2.

Roberts; Shackleton (1983). The Canoe: A History of the Craft from Panama to the Arctic. Macmillan of Canada. pp. 235–261. ISBN 0-7715-9582-4.

Stelmok, Jerry; Thurlow, Rollin (1987). The Wood and Canvas Canoe. Old Bridge Press. pp. 17–33. ISBN 0-88448-046-1.
