= The Backwaters Paddle Quest =

Eco-adventure fantasy contest

Coordinates: 44.546318°N 89.603911°W

PaddleQuest is a paddling based eco-adventure fantasy contest held annually in Stevens Point, WI on the Wisconsin River. The race is usually held on the second weekend of August. Players paddle their crafts for one or two days (with a night of rest in between) to checkpoints along the river where they encounter characters acting out a storyline that continues from year to year. At these checkpoints participants play a variety of games, collect items, and through their actions alter the course of the storyline.

== History ==
=== 2002 ===
The Backwaters Paddle Quest canoe-adventure race event was created by Matthew D. Kirsch in a 2002. The video featured three commentators who treated the canoe antics as serious and highly competitive. The first Paddle Quest was held in the Town of Hull and the participants consisted of three teams of three. Each team had a unique path along the river and were followed by an accompanying camera crew. The event was intended to last two days, but only took 8 hours. The winning team, Team Arrr! finished in less than six hours.

=== 2003: Legends ===
In the second year of the quest, the event was more developed and although the storyline was not as structured as it would later become, the race was held in relatively the same form as it is today. Channel 7 News WSAW was at Kirsch Camp covering the start of the event as participants paddled to checkpoints along the river, visiting characters such as: Lord Houlihan, Lord of the Marsh, Queen Nestra,Lord of the Backwaters(later called simply, The Wizard). At the Queen of the Lagoon, teams had to take one of the "Queens" to the party barge. The Queen had to get in an innertube and be towed up river. Along the way, each Queen had a unique challenge. The first day ended at Max Haviland's Island where the questers camped and started off again Sunday morning. At the end of the day on Sunday, the race finished at Kirsch Camp. "Team Phoenix" was victorious and were named the "Protectors of the Backwaters". Team "Tiny Boogers" took second place, team "Arrr!" took third and the "Little Pink Mafia" took fourth place. During the second day, Queen Nestra paddled to a spot different from the spot marked on the maps issued to the teams, which created much confusion. This led to the origins of Queen Nestra's storyline.

=== 2004: Highjinks ===
In the third year of the quest, the event was moved to Bahamas Lounge on HWY 10 west in Stevens Point. The new location gave teams access to food and beverage service as well as providing more space for boats. 10 teams participated in 2004, marking a sharp rise in attendance and a change in the structure of the race. 2004 Highjinks welcomed the introduction of Alpha Station and Bravo Station: pontoon boats that offered the teams different challenges. Upon completion of one challenge at a station, the team would receive an additional map leading to another challenge. If teams completed all challenges at both stations, they would receive a map to a Bi-Force, a circular two-piece puzzle with the letters 'P' and 'Q' etched on the pieces. Highjinks also marked the first appearance of the Pirates^{1}. 2004 Highjinks featured one of the most difficult challenges to date: The Tow. Teams had to tow people from the Alpha Station, to the Bravo Station. This proved to be incredibly difficult, as the distance was nearly three miles and the passengers were heavy adults. Arrr! was victorious and they were named the Protectors of the Backwaters. Team NOYC placed third, and were the first Paddle Quest team to complete a Bi-Force puzzle.

=== 2005: Fantasy ===
In the fourth year of the quest, the current storyline of PaddleQuest took shape. The questers started at Bahamas Lounge and tracked down the characters using their maps of the backwaters. Queen Nestra was again lost in the Marsh and Questers had to find her. Bear, once a quester himself, was stuck on a southern island and had gone mad after his defeat in 2004. On this island he lived for a year, fighting off attacks from the Pirates. Team Arrr! managed to bring a Paddle Quest Hero named White Lightning to the island, where he would stay until the following year in 2006. The Wizard, who was living on a northern sand bar, recruited teams to bring him his Star Stones which were 80lb boulders that teams had to transport across the distance of about 6 miles. The Evil Sorceress Sheera showed up in the backwaters and had teams gather magical items from around the backwaters for her: Meat from Bear, runes from the Wizard, blow-up damsels in distress from the Bog Demon and a cocktail from Bahamas bar. The King of the backwaters held court at Kirsch Camp, and played chess against the teams on an oversized chessboard. Across the pond from the King, the Bog Demon, summoned by the Evil Sorceress, lurked in the swamp guarding five blow-up damsels in distress. One team, the Juicy Fruities, got too close and were tipped. Team Speedwagon was able to also bring protection to Bear as well as transport a Star Stone to the Wizard, gaining enough tokens to be named the Protectors of the Backwaters. In second place were the Robot Monkey Ninja Pirates. Twelve teams competed in 2005 Fantasy and a video was produced for each team, highlighting their efforts. Other notable events were: The Jester's dog race, The Barbarian's tennis ball dodge and rock throw, and Evil Amy's swamp jog. The Pirates were also more prominent, with more regalia and managed to steal more items from the teams. One team member from The Burnouts, Kelly Hagen, traveled all the way from California to compete.

=== 2006: Genesis ===
In the fifth year of the quest, sixteen teams gathered at Bahamas Lounge to compete. Kirsch planned to shoot the 2006 event as a feature-length film and assembled 12 cameras and operators to shoot the event. The evil Sorceress Sheera has gained power from all the magical items collected in 2005, and summoned a pontoon boat called The Suffer Scow. From this vessel she trolled the backwaters searching for Queen Nestra. When teams boarded her ship, she offered them a challenge to whip each other with a horse whip and swim through mud for tokens as well as swear their allegiance to her (which many teams promptly broke). In 2006, the currency used for the event were Fish_Discs^{2}, also referred to as tokens. On day 2 of the event, Sheera the evil Sorceress along with the Bog Demon captured the three prophets and Queen Nestra herself. Teams were challenged with the task of rescuing them. To rescue a prophet, teams had to have already collected a Bear medallion, a power helm, and a magic cape. To rescue Queen Nestra, teams needed to have all of the aforementioned magical items as well as a completed Bi-Force puzzle. Holding the Bi-Force high, Captain Nick Hegarty of team Arrr! rescued the Queen aboard a PaddleQuest hero vessel and delivered her to Bear. Bear and Queen Nestra then formed a secret love affair which would frame the events of the following year in PaddleQuest 2007. The band Elf Lettuce played at the 2006 festivities.

=== 2007: Omens ===
In the sixth year of the quest, 13 teams gathered at Bahamas Lounge where the King and Bear faced off against one another in a heated debate, with the Questing teams watching. The King called Bear a traitor and Bear accused the King of allying himself with the Sorceress. Teams had to choose sometime during the first day, either to side with Bear or with the King and the Sorceress, who were indeed forming an alliance. The Bog Demon had captured damsels at Lakeside Bar and he was trying to breed with them. At Club 10, just south of Bahamas, the Sorceress made teams perform "Sacred Rights" in order to gather spiritual energies. The sacred rites consisted of: whippings, head-shavings and signing and dancing around the fire-pit. Just off-shore from Club 10, the Merrill Merchants had a ski boat and were taking one member of a team waterskiing for tokens. Further North, Bear was aboard Alpha Station with Queen Nestra seeking questers to join them. Teams that elected to join Bear were adorned in yellow arm and head bands. The King and Prophet Steve were aboard the Bravo Station nearby, and were trying to gain the allegiance of teams also. Heavy winds during the first day of competition eventually ended the events early as a thunderstorm loomed. To the far west, The Dark Prophet and Bad Kirsch were aboard the suffer scow and challenged teams to roll 10 sider of fate. This dice game sent teams into the mud, made them chug hot root beer, etc. On the second day of 2007 Omens, the teams all gathered in the Kirsch Camp lagoon. Teams that had sided with Bear camped out at the Wizard Pond just across from Kirsch Camp. Teams that sided with the King and the Sorceress, stayed at Kirsch Camp. The King's army was to defend the "Heart Stone" which was a circular red orb that gave the holder power over the area. Bear's army outnumbered the King's by about 11 to 3, and the first attack was victorious. Because of the vast numbers of Bear's army and disagreements about the validity of the first attack, the "War" was reset and again resulted with Bear's army winning. As a result, Bear and Nestra took the throne and the King was banished to the backwaters in his kayak. The Killer Guppies, who led Bear's army, were victorious and named the protectors of the backwaters as they collected the most tokens. In a close second were the Red Neck River Rats, led by Captain George Clarke.

=== 2008: Invasion ===
In the seventh year of the quest, 18 teams gathered at Bahamas Lounge to quest. In 2007, the Bog Demon had kidnapped damsels to breed and the Questers had saved all but one- and the spawning had occurred. His eggs were laid in a northern bog and two Bog Babies had already been spawned. At the start, Pirate Captain Abraham Abraham motored his Pirate barge nearby Bahamas screaming threats to Bear and to the Questers. Bear warned of the eggs hatching and also that teams should try to find the lost King. The Alpha Station was refurbished in 2008, and was transformed into the Alpha Bistro, a 24-foot-long (7.3 m), 16-foot-wide (4.9 m) twin-engine behemoth pontoon. Characters aboard were White Lightning, Black Thunder, Prophet Amy and other heroes. at Lakeside Bar, the Bog Demon and the Dark Damsel along with their Bog Babies – put the teams through a variety of challenges. To the north, the King's Wizard (now sided with Bear) and Prophet Steve – had found the eggs and the questers had to collect and destroy the eggs. Nearby on Pirate Island, teams played "Red Neck Croquet" in which players would swing sledge hammers to bowling balls, pushing them through rebar hoops. To the east of Pirate Island at Grubba Marina, Freedle Frogesh challenged teams to play in his collection of games (badminton, leap frog, burping) and defend his collection of Power Orbs which defended his camp from Pirate intruders. The Pirates, realizing that Bear was distracted by the Bog Demon, were attempting to take Grubba Marina for their own. Captain Abraham Abraham spent the first day trying to get teams to join him in his battle for Grubba Marina. Meanwhile, Freedle Frogesh was raising his own army. At Kirsch Camp, Bear and Nestra along with Lady Cornelia offered a variety of challenges such as a water balloon launch and canoe-disc. North of Kirsch Camp, Kekoa and Lalani, Hawaiian warriors from Halloween Island put questers through several different challenges. The Killer Guppies found The King adrift in the backwaters and delivered him to Bravo Station and the Righteous Monkey. The Monkey then delivered the King to Lakeside Bar, and because the Bog Demon's spawning inevitably failed, the King was able to pacify the Bog Demon and they formed a friendship. Nearby at Club 10, Sheera the Evil Sorceress continued to gain power by shaving the heads of questers. On day 2, she had enough power to not only capture the Alpha-Bistro, but also to corrupt White Lightning, Black Thunder and the Wizard. Together they sailed the backwaters and forced questers to perform different kinds of humiliating tasks. In preparation for the war on day 2 at Grubba Marina, Captain Abraham Abraham did not gather many teammates and Freedle was victorious. Freedle was aided by the Killer Guppies and O' Fools!, and the Pirates were promptly expelled. The Killer Guppies were victorious in 2008 and again named the Protectors of the Backwaters. This was the third victory for Paul Leonard, Captain of the Guppies.

=== 2009: Revelations of the Great Spirit ===
In the eighth year of the quest, the Evil Forces began to shift into power. Teams again gathered at Bahamas Lounge despite a forecast of thunderstorms throughout the weekend. At the start, Bear gathered the Questers to warn about the Sorceress opening a portal on the Alpha-Bistro. Suddenly, the Alpha-Bistro loomed near with the Sorceress screaming out for Bear to give up. The Wizard, corrupted by the Sorceress, was very vocal, condemning the backwaters and the Kingdom of Bear. White Lightning, also on board, leapt off the ship after the crowd chanted for him to return to the side of good. The King of the backwaters had set up camp at Lakeside Bar where he now worked as a bartender. The Bog Demon and the Dark Damsel lived there as well, challenging teams to a variety of challenges. The Evil Sorceress had taken control of the Alpha-Bistro and was attempting to open a portal to another dimension. This portal would bring an ancient evil into the backwaters. In order to do so, she had to create a circle of evil that would open this gateway. To stop her efforts, questing teams had to gather different animal spirits from around the backwaters that would ultimately summon the Great Spirit, who would help stop the Sorceress in her tracks. The teams had to gather: Eyes of the Hawk, Tail of the Squirrel, Bracelet of the Frog, Band of the Deer, Foil of the Musky, Medallion of the Bear, and Feather of the Turkey. On day 2, Kekoa, Bear and the King were reconciled and joined the Bog Demon on the Bravo Station barge- uniting in revelry. The Sorceress and the Pirates had also formed large armies and in the final battle, the portal was incomplete. To determine the winner in the stalemate, a race back to The Bahamas was initiated, and the teams paddled fiercely back to the bar. Team Bath Time Fun was nearly at the dock to win, but capsized with about 20 feet to go. Second place was a team that was disqualified for false registration and incorrect pairing, meaning they were not co-ed. In third place was JLA, who were sided with the Evil Forces. On top of JLA winning this race, Team Bangarang! was named the protectors in 2009. They had collected all of the animal spirits and they had been turned undead. This allowed the Evil Sorcress to then open her portal unchallenged. The Chicago group Snuckafoo played at Paddle Quest 2009 with songwriter and performer, Jonathan Kirsch.

=== 2010: New Order ===
In the ninth year of the quest, queersters gathered at the new location (Lakeside Bar) to set forth on yet another quest. This was the first year that featured pre-registration and 26 teams had done so. Also introduced were the three classes: Class A, class B and class K. The event was being held as a fundraiser for the Boys and Girls Club of Portage County. 90 FM and the OZ were present to broadcast from the Saturday morning freakshow. At the event, the final tally was 26 teams(22 Class A team, three class B and one Class K). Class A featured coed teams of three, Class B teams of two and Class K were solo kayakers. At Lakeside Saturday morning, the King addressed the many queersters asking for their allegiance and to aid in the retrieval of the many Imps that plague the backwaters. Then Nukpana, the evil Imp lord who was summoned through a portal to another dimension, appeared and also asked for the queersters help before he was chased away by Bear who was now aligned with the King. As Bear addressed the crowd, the Bistro loomed close and Sheera and the Wizard called out to the queersters to ignore Bear and the King and to join them instead. There were about 19 treasures, 8 event locations and 30+ character volunteers. The Killer Guppies were the 2010 Protectors collecting 385 points, which was 100 points more than the second place team.

=== 2016: Red Destiny ===
^{1}The Pirates consisted of 3 Chicagoans that were out to steal all of the treasures in the backwaters. Unaffiliated with the event, they stole the remaining bi-force from an island and shipped it to the creator of Paddle Quest months later at his Santa Monica, CA address.

^{2} A fishing lure invented by Dr. John M. Kirsch, M.D.

== Photos ==
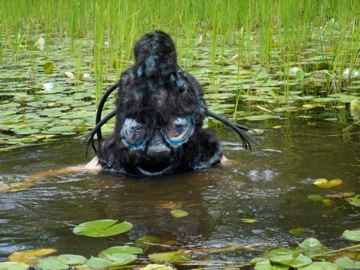

Bog Demon in 2005

Paddlers waiting to start in 2005

Article from Media coverage in 2004

== Characters ==
"PaddleQuest"

- Bear- William Harlow MacBeth
- Queen Nestra- Lorelei MacBeth
- The Bog Demon- Johnny "Pabs" Pawlak and Dan Busa
- The King- Mike Wrzinski, Wes James, Aaron Enequist-Leiker and Chad Laska
- Wizard- Greg Kirsch, Tom Kirsch, Sue Canevello and Ryan Parks
- Prophet Steve- Steve Greene
- White Lightning- Nick "Slick" Wrzinski
- The Evil Sorceress Sheera- Jahna Cook
- Jolly Green Captain- Matt Valtman
- Evil Monkeys- Amy Moreland, Rory Welch, Chad Laska and Dan Busa
- Kekoa- Bryson Pouw
- Freedle Frogesh- Wes James
- Lady Cornelia- Leah Pouw
- Lanani- Dana Cook
- The Barbarian- Ryan Kolodziej
- PQ Heroes- De-Ann Kolodzjei, Galen Bayen Allsion and John Pearson
- Hero Cousin- Joey Burness
- Prophet Woody- J.M. Nickels
- Prophet Busa- Dan Busa
- Righteous Monkey- Adam Lubinski
- The Great Spirit- John Pearson
- The Hawk Spirit- John Pearson
- Musky Spirit- Alex Canevllo
- Squirrel Spirit- Steve
- Deer Spirit- Josh Shapiro
- Lord of the Marsh- Matt Ebel
- Lord Houlihan- Sean Houlihan
- Lord Highjinks- Mike Terch
- Evil Amy- Amy le
- La Pescadara- Julie Seramur
- Queens of the Lagoon- Sara Osowski, Heidi Richter, Rose Osowski and Katie
- Captain K.Runch a.k.a. The Medicine Man - Jef Schobert
