= Paddle leash =

Sea kayaking equipment

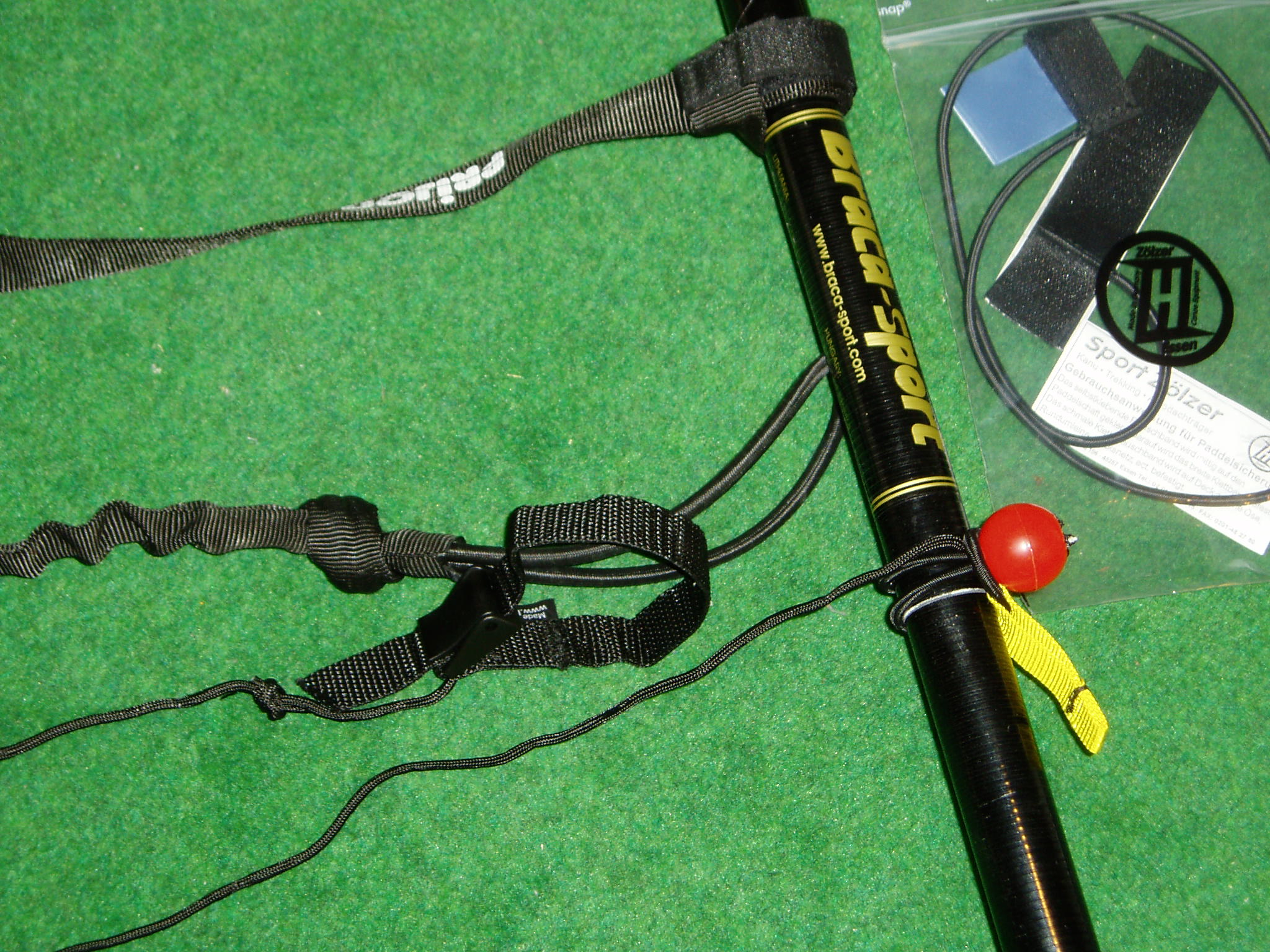
Several paddle leash attached to a paddle.

A paddle leash is used to secure a paddle in open water with a sea kayak. Especially on solo tours after capsizing a paddle might drift away through wind or waves and not be recovered. A paddle leash must not be used in whitewater kayaking due to the danger of getting strangled.
