= Paddle float =

Kayaking tool

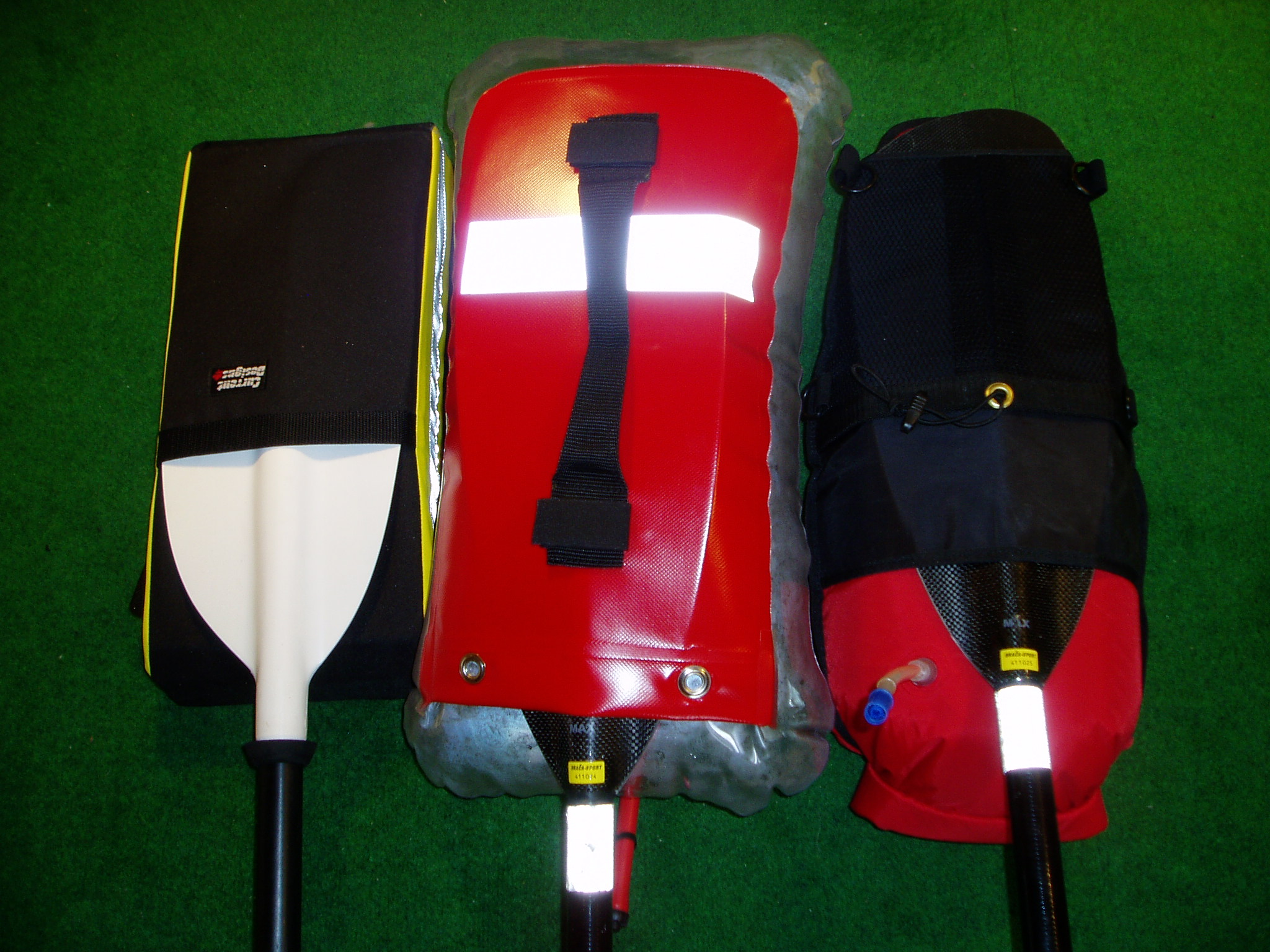
Three paddle floats

A paddle float may be used for reentry into a kayak after a capsize in open water. It may also be used for a reentry and roll, or for training a kayak roll. There are two main variants of paddle floats; the inflatable variant and foam variant. The inflatable variant is more popular, but needs to be inflated before use. Alternatively, one can use the foam variant, which usually has less buoyancy, but may be easier to handle in cold conditions. In an emergency, it is also possible to use a life jacket as an improvised paddle float.
