= Texas Water Safari =

Boat race in Texas, US

The Texas Water Safari is a boat race down waterways from San Marcos, Texas, to Seadrift, Texas. The total distance traveled is 262 miles. Racers must take all equipment needed with them, receiving only medical supplies, food, water, and ice along the way. The primary requirement is a boat powered only by human muscle. The event was first held in 1963, and is run annually. The race begins on the second Saturday of June of each year, barring bad weather.

In 1962 Frank Brown and Bill "Big Willie" George navigated from San Marcos to Corpus Christi without a motor. In 1963 they created the Texas Water Safari which would become an annual race.

== Course ==
The course includes natural rivers like the San Marcos, with rapids and dams. Most boats destroyed on the course are lost in the upper river. The San Marcos River converges with the Guadalupe River and becomes wider and slower. The main dangers in the middle river are sweepers, downed trees, logjams and dams. Near the end of the course there are lakes and swamps, and it ends with a crossing of the San Antonio Bay. Other challenges include alligators, sharks, water moccasin, fire ants, and mosquitos.

There are 11 checkpoints including the finish line. Their locations are published and they are staffed with officials. Each checkpoint has a cutoff time the racers must meet or be disqualified. The final cutoff time at the finish is 100 hours. The team captain of each team must be present at the checkpoint to sign off the team's time as the team leaves. Checkpoints:

- Staples Dam
- Luling 90
- Palmetto State Park
- Gonzales Dam
- Hochheim
- Cuero 766 (Cheapside)
- Cuero 236
- Victoria City Park
- Swinging Bridge (often referred to as Invista or Dupont)
- Calhoun Riverside RV Retreat
- Seadrift

== Records ==
Athletes compete in classes. The Unlimited class has no restriction, except that the watercraft is powered only by human muscle, and restricted since 2006 to crews no greater than six. Attempts have been made to race craft of unconventional form, but the best results have been achieved by well-trained teams in crewboats.

Record	Fastest time or Youngest age	Year achieved	Holder(s)
Overall Fastest Time / Unlimited	29:46	1997	Bryan & Fred Mynar, John Dunn, Jerry Cochran, Steve Landick, and Soloman Carriere
Tandem Unlimited	35:17	1987	John Bugge & Mike Shively
Men's Solo Unlimited	36:03	2007	Carter Johnson
Master's	36:06	2004	John Maika, Vance Sherrod, Pete Binnion, Jim Pye, and Pat Petrisky
USCA C-2	36:27	1997	Allen Spelce and West Hansen
Men's USCA C-1	37:07	2007	Jerry Rayburn
Mixed	37:45	2007	Deborah Lane and Fred Mynar
Standard	38:18	1992	Lynn Wilson and Ron Lightfoot of Canada
Aluminum	38:55	1997	Donald and Daniel Baumbach
Women's Unlimited	41:39	2015	Virginia Condie & Kaitlin Jiral
Novice	44:03	2004	Allen Chellette & George Melder
Adult-Child	46:11	1997	Kyle & Joe Mynar
Women's Solo Unlimited	49:26	2004	Holly Nelson (now Holly Orr)
Women's USCA C1	57:49	2014	Holly Orr
Youngest USCA C-1 Finisher & Winner, Female	20Y 11M 28D	2011	Courtney Weber
Youngest USCA C-1 Finisher & Winner, Male	17Y 9M 1D	2010	Max Feaster
Youngest Finisher	9Y 5M 12D	2003	Jessica Bugge
Youngest Woman Solo Finisher	18Y 4M 28D	2009	Rebekah Zeek
All-Time Tandem 'Safari Spirit' Team		2002; 2003	Chris and Matthew "Matt" Baker
