= Snow boating =

Winter sport

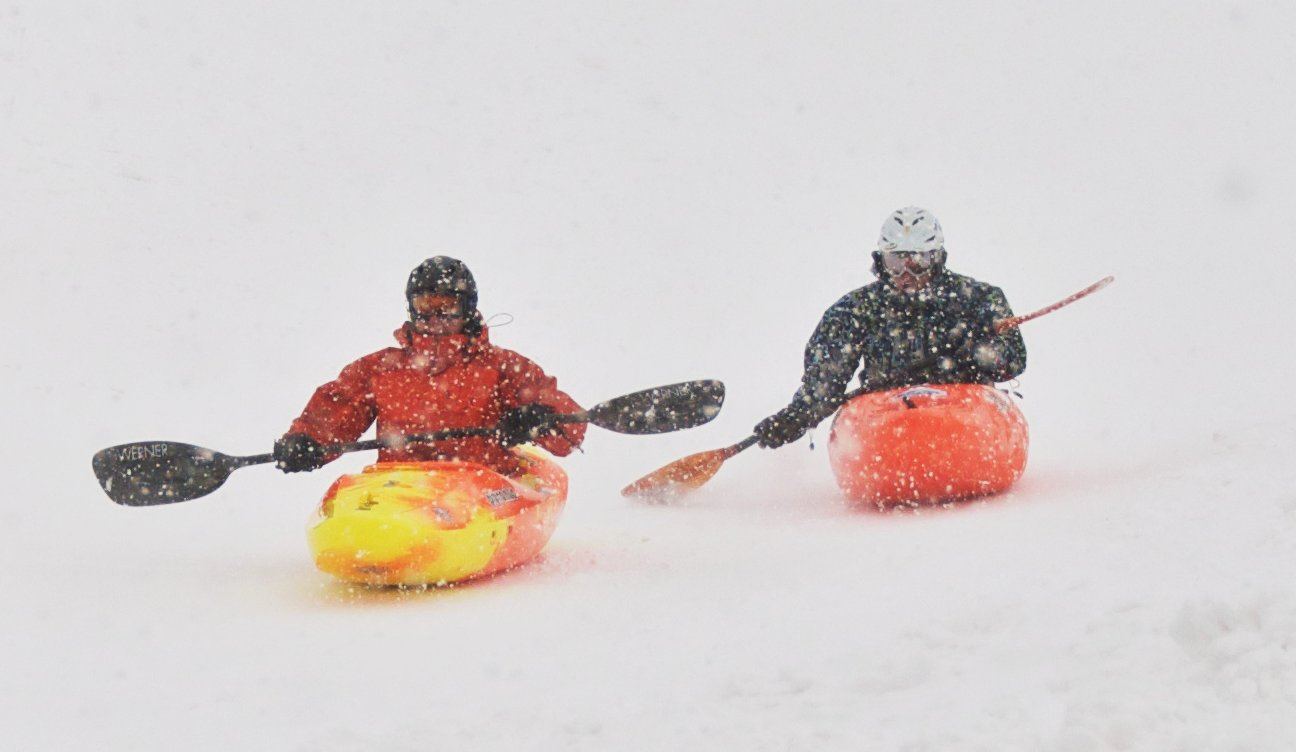
Two Snow boaters at Monarch Ski Area, Colorado

Snow boating or snow kayaking is a winter sport that usually involves kayakers descending snow slopes, in contrast to river sports such as whitewater kayaking for which the boats were usually designed. Typically either playboats or creek-boats are used depending on the style of snowboating to be done. Although PFDs are not worn, helmets, and paddles are often used. Snow boating is typically done in the backcountry and occasionally at resorts and ski areas. Races are held in a modus similar to those of snowboarding they are known as a boatercross.

== History ==
The first snow boating race was held in Lienz, Austria by a local group of kayakers in 2002 and in 2007 a so-called 'world championship' was held in Lienz where Peter Draxl from Austria was the first champion. Subsequent world championships moved indoors to better control the terrain. Filmmaker Warren Miller is credited with raising the profile of snowboating.
