= Tidal race =

Fast-moving tidal flow

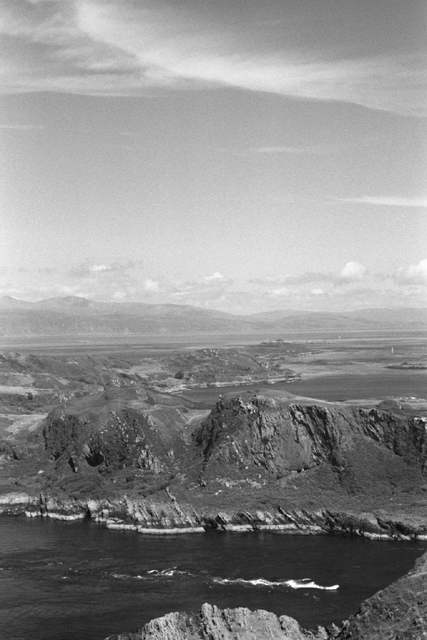
View to Lunga from Scarba, across Scotland's "Grey Dog" tidal race

Tidal race or tidal rapid is a natural occurrence whereby a fast-moving tide passes through a constriction, resulting in the formation of waves, eddies and hazardous currents. The constriction can be a passage where the sides narrow, for example the Gulf of Corryvreckan and the Saltstraumen maelstrom, or an underwater obstruction (a reef or rising seabed), such as is found at the Portland Race in the United Kingdom.

In extreme cases, such as Skookumchuck Narrows in British Columbia, through which tides can travel at more than 17 knots (31 km/h), very large whirlpools develop, which can be extremely hazardous to navigation.

== Notable tidal races ==
- Cape Reinga in New Zealand
- Skookumchuck Narrows in British Columbia, Canada
- The Bitches in Wales, United Kingdom
- Falls of Lora in Scotland, United Kingdom
- Portland Bill on the Isle of Portland, United Kingdom
- The Alderney Race (12 knots+) between Alderney and La Hague, Normandy, France
- The Raz de Sein in western Brittany, France
- The Fromveur Passage in western Brittany, France
- Horizontal Falls in Western Australia, Australia
- Naruto Strait between Shikoku and Awaji Islands, Japan
- Reversing Falls in Saint John, New Brunswick, Canada

== See also ==
- Gut (coastal geography) – Type of coastal body of water
- Rip current – Water current moving away from shore
- Tidal bore – Water wave traveling up a river or narrow bay because of an incoming tide
