= Tour de Gudenå =

Annual kayak and canoe race in Denmark

The Tour de Gudenå is a 120 km flatwater kayak and canoe race along the Gudenå river in Denmark. It is held on the second weekend of September each year.

Starting in Skanderborg, participants paddle to Silkeborg via the Skanderborg lake, Mossø lake, Julsø lake and several other, minor lakes along the Gudenå river on the first day of the competition. After an overnight stay in Silkeborg, the next day of the competition brings the paddlers to the finish line in Randers via the Tange Sø lake which forms part of the continued course of the Gudenå. In addition to the main 120 km distance, the event includes several shorter distance races which appeal to a wide variety of participants.

The Tour de Gudenå was established in 1967; the 40th anniversary of the race in 2007 was a grand event with almost 900 participants. Unfortunately it was also the first time that the race had to be temporarily suspended due to strong winds and heavy seas on Mossø and Julsø.
