= Hawaii-sur-Rhone =

Sports venue in Lyon

Coordinates: 45°47′30.36″N 4°52′35.83″E

Hawaiï-sur-Rhône is a freestyle kayaking venue and natural standing wave on the River Rhône.
