= Breede River Canoe Marathon =

Annual South African two-day kayak race

The Breede River Canoe Marathon is an annual South African K2 (doubles) race down the Breede River from Robertson to Swellendam in the Western Cape over a distance of 75 km. The two-day race through scenic wine country, was first run in 1968, and is usually held during September when good rains ensure reasonable water levels.

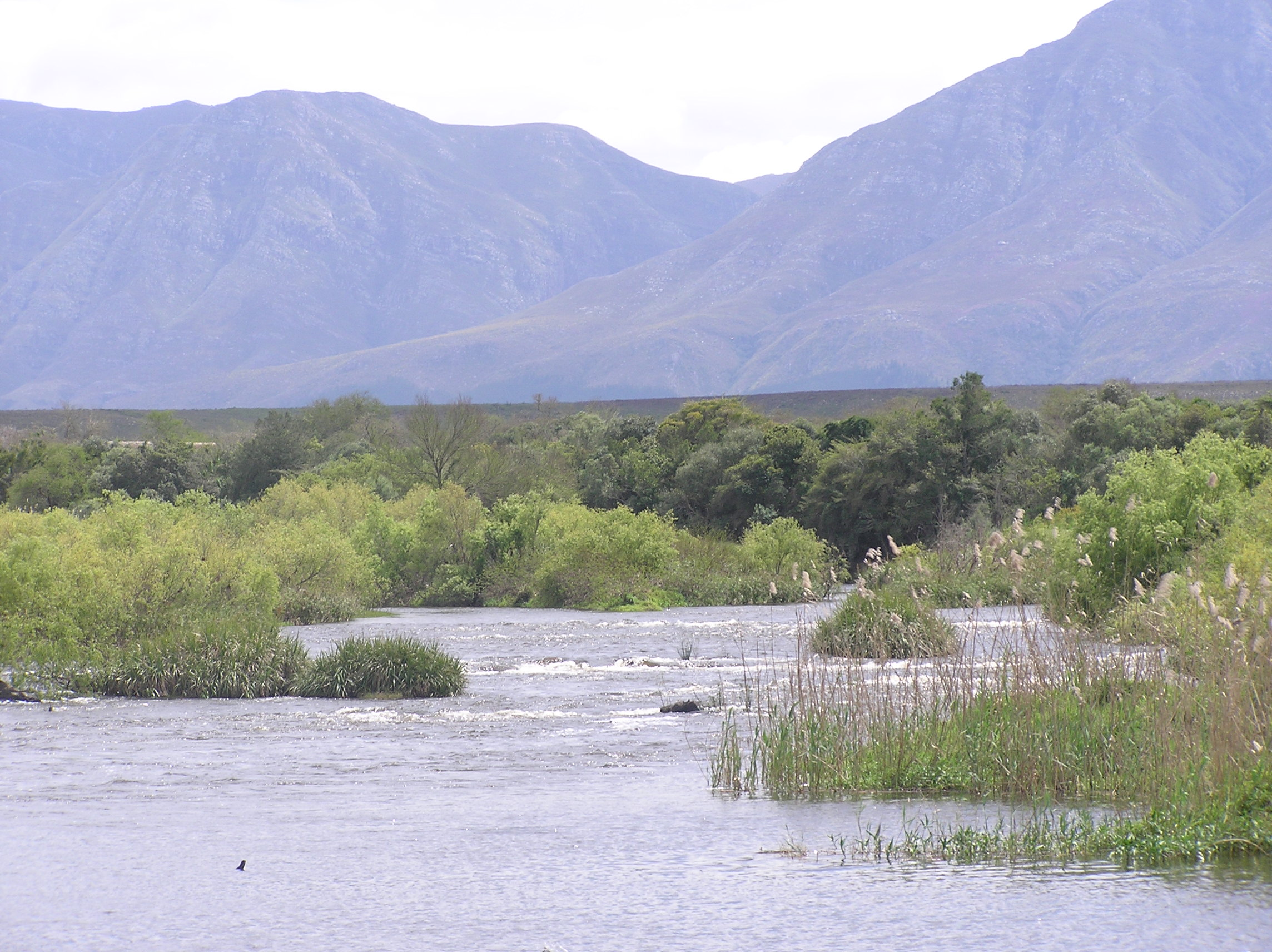
Breede River near Swellendam - Langeberg in background
