= Squirt boating =

Type of whitewater kayaking

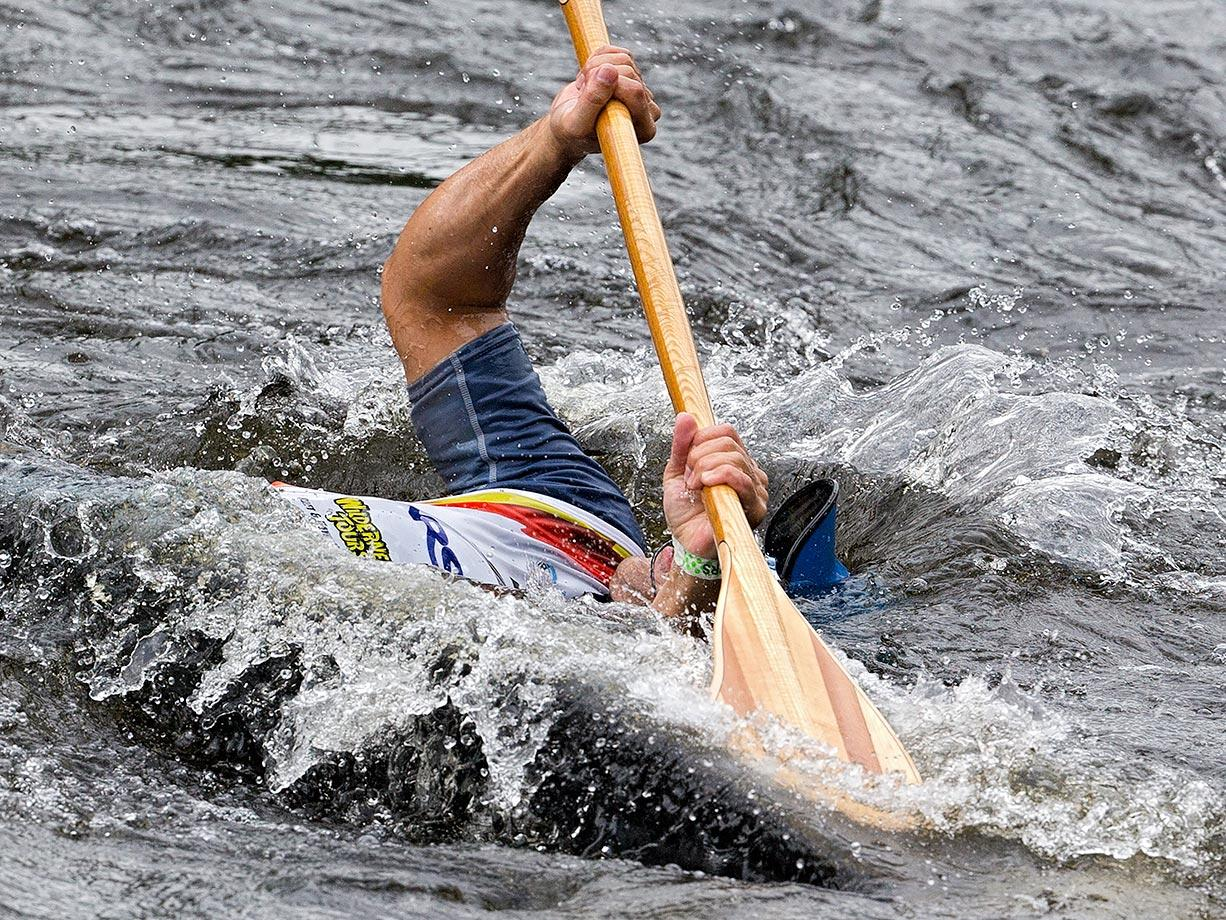
A squirt boat is a kayak that barely floats, allowing the paddler to submerge completely.

Squirt boating is a form of whitewater kayaking where the boat is designed to be as low in volume as possible while still allowing the paddler to float. Squirt boats are designed to use both surface and underwater currents to maneuver within the water. These maneuvers can be used to effect navigational control or to perform tricks.

== Overview ==
Physically, a typical squirt boat is similar to a whitewater kayak (K1) or covered canoe (C1) but is distinct in the following ways:

- The side profile of a squirt boat is very flat when compared to a whitewater kayak or C1.
- The volume of a squirt boat is generally less than half of the volume of a normal kayak of the same length. This often ranges from 24 to 35 U.S. gallons (91 to 132 liters) for a squirt boat, but 50 to 70 U.S. gallons (190 to 260 liters) for a typical kayak.
- Squirt boats often have foot bumps that enable the boat to maintain an ultra-low volume while still providing room for the feet.
- When in the water, 70–80% of the boat will be underwater.
- Squirt boats are designed to specialize in certain tricks. For example, the Bigfoot and Shred squirt boats are designed for Mystery Moves, while squirt boats like the Skunk and Hellbender are designed for cartwheels.

== History ==
Squirt boating originally evolved from slalom kayaks. Racers found that if they let the upstream hip drop into the current and slide the stern of the boat under water, they could decrease the amount of time required to make large degree turns (90+ degrees). West Virginia kayaker Phil Coleman dubbed it squirt because of the way the boats squirted forward with extra speed thanks to the trapped buoyancy of the stern and the shape of the hull and deck. It is analogous to squeezing a pumpkin seed in between two fingers and having the subsequent pressure shoot it out.

After this original maneuver was developed, a number of paddlers noticed that squirting was a lot of fun and introduced a new method of playing on the river. Squirts allowed the boats to get vertical even in flat water. The problem was that the predominant kayak designs of the 1980s were not conducive to performing squirts. Most kayaks at the time were more than 10 feet long and had a volume greater than 70 U.S. gallons (260 liters). Jess Whittemore, a kayak designer, designed the first chopped boats based on race boat designs that were intended to squirt. Then, one fairly well known paddler, boat designer, and paddle maker by the name of Jim Snyder decided to try and create a shorter boat that was designed to squirt that could also be used for running and playing on the river. The result, after many years of trial and error, was a radically low volume boat.

== Maneuvers ==
- Squirts - 'Squirting,' moves the boat from flat to vertical. The feeling of the boat doing a squirt is similar to the feeling of having one's hand at an angle, out the window of a fast moving vehicle, rising or falling and turning against the flow of air. There are several hydraulic river features that facilitate this manoeuvre.
- Screw-Around/Screw-Up – This is a vertical or past vertical manoeuvre where the kayak is pivoted around its long axis. It is usually performed after a squirt.
- Blasts - "Blasting," is typically done in a vertical pour over, although it can be accomplished in a less vertical hydraulic (or hole), the effect is smaller. The effect of the move is to have either the bow or stern of the kayak sandwiched between the upstream flow of the river and the reversal flow of the hydraulic. In vertical features, the kayak is balanced vertically.
- Mystery Moves – In a mystery move, the kayak and paddler submerge entirely into the flow of the river via total immersion into downward flow.
- Cartwheels – The kayak transitions from vertical to vertical, sideways, using the "smash" technique of rotating one's hips and boat against the paddle-torso configuration.
- Double Ender - Similar to a cartwheel, but older in origin. The transition in a double ender is performed with squirt, rather than smash, principles.
- Zero to Hero – When surfacing from a mystery move upside down, the paddler executes a "screw around,"/"screw-up," and effectively surfaces vertically.
- Clean Wheel - A variation of the cartwheel, executed without the usual paddle strokes.
- Clue – The boat and boater sit partially submerged in a hydraulic.
- Loop – Different from the loop in rodeo/play boating, a loop in squirt boating refers to a roll around the long axis of the boat while submerged in a mystery move. There are three variations of the loop, described below:
  - The Loop – Essentially an Eskimo roll performed underwater.
  - The Retarded Loop – Performed the same as a loop but the second half of the roll (from upside down to right side up) starts as the hull breaks the surface of water.
  - The Light Loop – A high energy loop where the boat is thrust partially out of the water as it breaks through the surface. It has the appearance of the boat exploding out of the water to an upright position from underwater by way of a 180 degree rotation.

== Terms ==
- Squirt – A maneuver that uses the inverse of Bernoulli's principle to turn a kayak, covered canoe, or squirt boat by using all three dimensions.
- Hull – The bottom-most surface of a boat.
- Deck - The top-most surface of a boat. / Slang for Spraydeck.
- CHARC – "Charging Arc"
- Stick – Slang term for paddle.
- Chine – The portion of the boat where the hull and deck meet. A soft chine refers to the angle that the deck and hull make when they meet, maximally 180 degrees. A hard chine refers to a more acute angle, approaching and angle of zero degrees.
