= Millrace Rapids =

Kayaking spot on the Saluda River in South Carolina, US

Coordinates: 34.012°N 81.080°W

Millrace Rapids is a popular kayaking playspot, located on the Lower Saluda River in Columbia, South Carolina.

== History ==
The rapids are a result of the Saluda River running over the remains of a twice-dynamited coffer dam.

== Features ==
- Blast-O-Matic
- Dumbass Hole
- Cookie Monster
- Square Eddy
- Fisherman's Rock
- Pop-up Hole

== Events and Competitions ==
- Millrace Massacre and Iceman Competition

== Safety Concerns ==
Because the lower Saluda is flow-controlled by a hydroelectric dam (operated by Dominion Energy), the water level can change rapidly. There is a warning system in place that consists of a series of sirens and strategically placed markers.
