= Sport in Bedfordshire =

Sports in Bedfordshire, England

This is an outline of Sport in Bedfordshire, a county in England.

== American football ==
The Bedfordshire Blue Raiders are members of the British American Football League.

== Cricket ==
The Bedfordshire County Cricket Club is Bedfordshire's county cricket club. They are classed as one of the 'Minor Counties' in the English domestic cricket structure, representing the historic county of Bedfordshire in the Minor Counties Championship and the MCCA Knockout Trophy.

The club play most of their matches at Wardown Park, Luton.

Other cricket venues in the county include:

- Ampthill Park, Ampthill
- The Vale, Flitwick
- Goldington Bury, Bedford
- Lancot Park, Dunstable
- Southill Park Cricket Club, Southill
- Bedford Modern School, Bedford

The club has produced several cricketers who have made an impact on the first-class game:

- Louis Bookman
- Tom Clark
- Alastair Cook
- Alf Gover
- Wayne Larkins
- Geoff Millman
- Monty Panesar

== Field hockey ==
Leighton Buzzard Hockey Club, established in 1901, have 4 Men's, 4 Ladies teams of all ability and a junior section; starting age of 5 years old.

== Football ==
Luton Town Football Club is by far the most successful and supported team in the county, though there are numerous other teams competing at various levels. The Bedfordshire County Football Association is the governing body of football in the county, and run a number of cups at different levels for teams in the area.

=== Luton Town Football Club ===
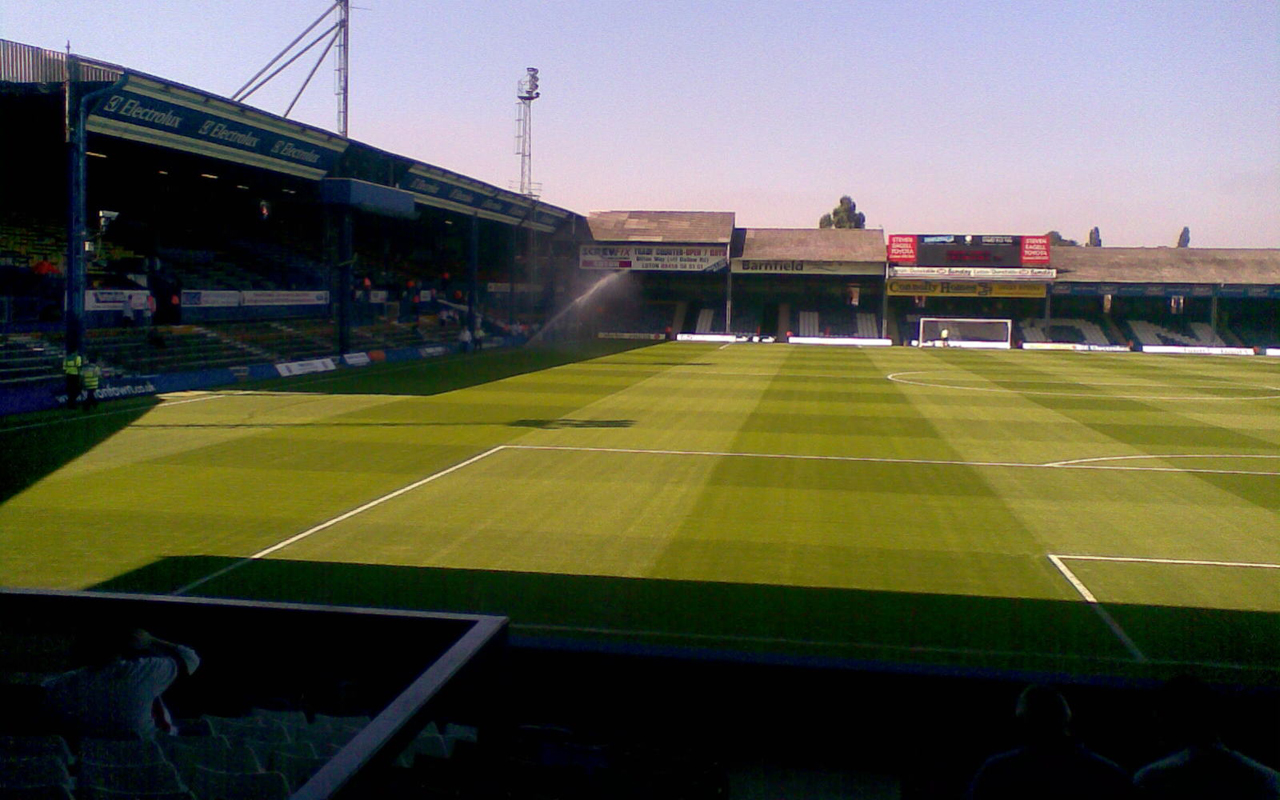
Kenilworth Road, the biggest stadium in Bedfordshire: home to Luton Town Football Club

Luton is the hometown of Luton Town Football Club who currently play in League One, the third level of the English football league system after a five-year spell in the National Conference League (following their 30 point deduction from the Football League during the 2008/09 season) was followed by back-to-back promotions in 2018 and 2019. After placing 3rd in the 2022–23 season, they were put in the playoffs final against Coventry City, and after a 1-1 draw, Luton won on penalties promoting them to the Premier League. Their sole season in the top flight was followed by back-to-back relegations in 2024 and 2025. They are the biggest and most successful team in the county and have enjoyed spells in the highest flight of English football. Their nickname, "The Hatters", dates back to when Luton had a substantial millinery industry.

=== Levels 5-6 ===
- Conference National

The top flight of the Football Conference. Teams promoted from the Conference, pending they meet certain rules, are eligible to play in the English Football League.

=== Levels 7-8 ===
Southern Football League

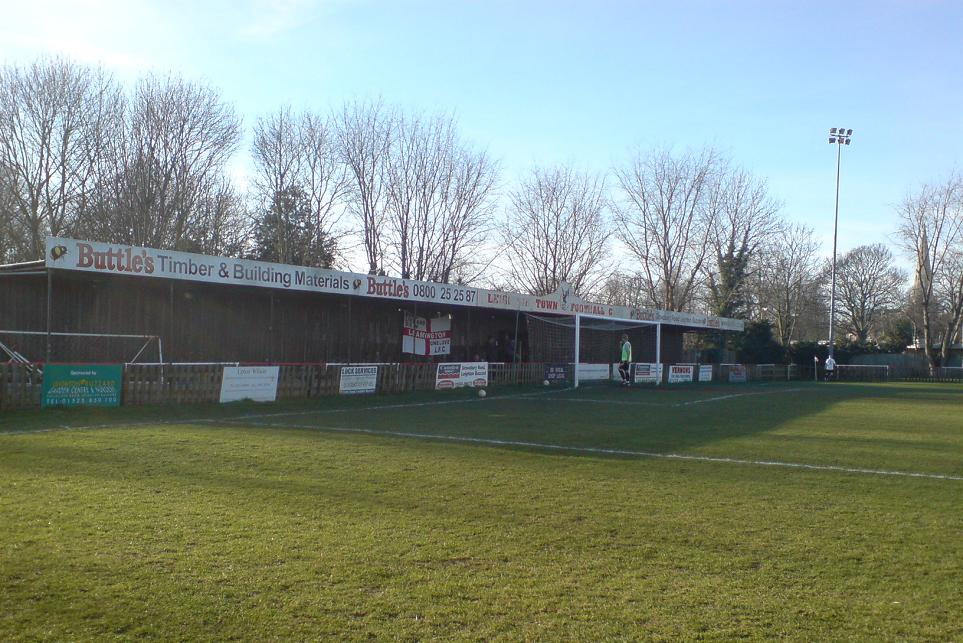
A terrace at Bell Close, home to Leighton Town F.C.

Luton Town FC was one of the 16 founding members of the league back in 1894. Currently, winners of the league are promoted to the Conference South (or North sometimes due to team balancing.

- Division 1 Central
  - A.F.C. Dunstable
  - A.F.C. Kempston Rovers
  - Barton Rovers F.C.
  - Bedford Town F.C.
  - Biggleswade F.C.
  - Biggleswade Town F.C.

=== Levels 9-11 ===
Spartan South Midlands League
The Spartan South Midlands League consists of teams from London and the Home Counties. The league feeds the Southern Football League and Isthmian League.

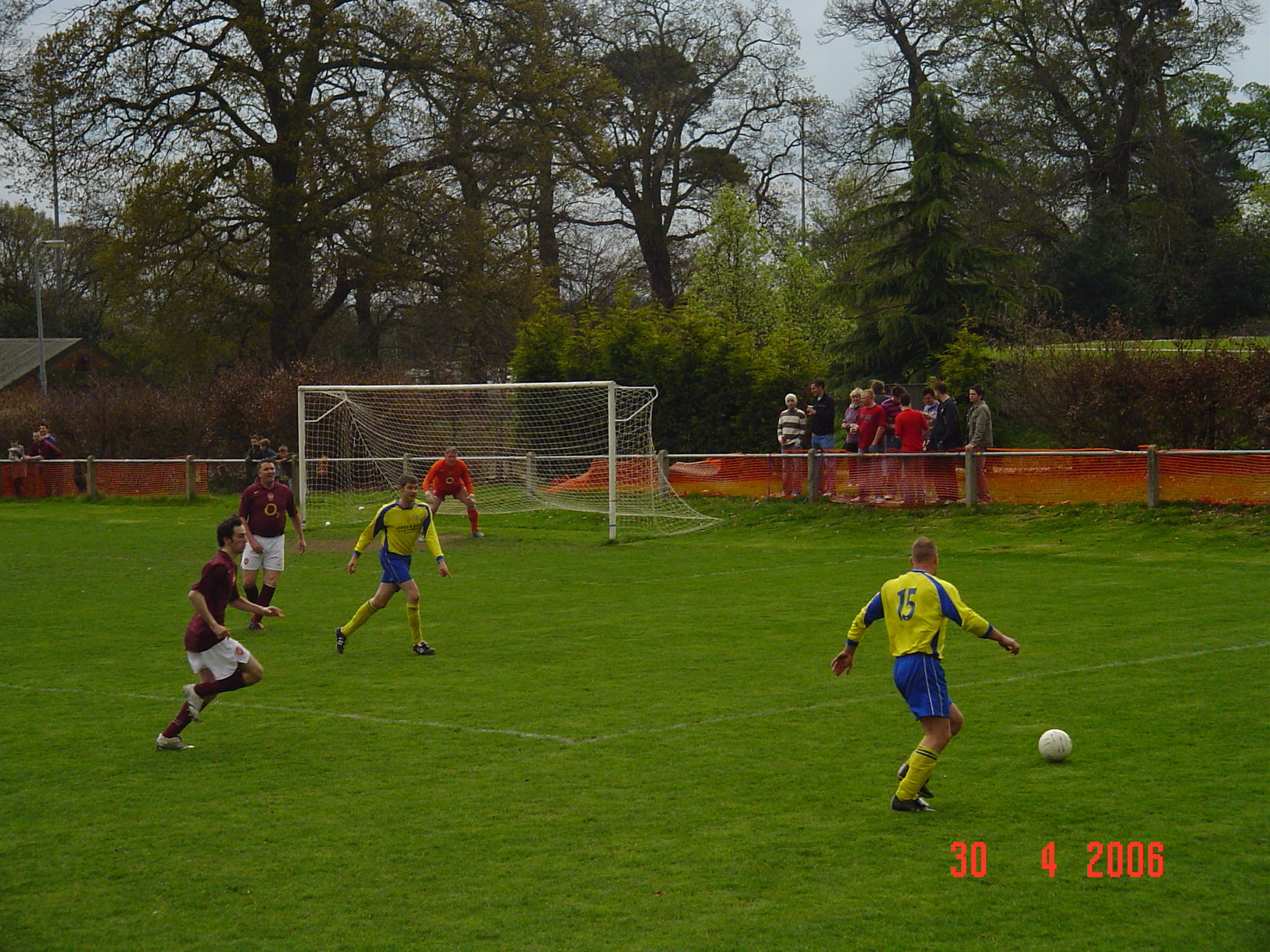
Ampthill Town F.C. (yellow) playing a celebrity charity match against Arsenal (red)

- Premier League
  - Arlesey Town F.C.
  - Dunstable Town F.C.
  - Leighton Town F.C.
- Division 1
  - Ampthill Town F.C.
  - Bedford F.C.
  - Langford F.C.
  - Stotfold F.C.
- Division 2
  - The 61 F.C. (Luton)
  - Totternhoe F.C.

United Counties Football League
The United Counties Football League covers Northamptonshire and Bedfordshire, as well as parts of Berkshire, Buckinghamshire, Cambridgeshire, Hertfordshire, and Lincolnshire. It has a total of four divisions: 2 first team, and 2 reserve team divisions. Clubs in the Premier Division are eligible to enter the FA Cup in the preliminary round stages, and those with floodlights are eligible to enter the FA Vase. There are also knockout cups for the Premier/Division One clubs and for the Reserve Divisions clubs.

- Premier Division South
  - Biggleswade United F.C.
  - Potton United F.C.

=== Levels 11-15 ===
Bedfordshire County Football League
Amateur teams in Bedfordshire compete in a league which comprises tiers 11-15 in the English football league system. The league has 71 members spread across five divisions. When a club wins the league championship, it also gains the opportunity to join either the United Counties Football League or the Spartan South Midlands League.

The league runs separate league cups for each division – the Premier Division clubs play for the Britannia Cup, Divisions One clubs play for the Centenary Cup, Division Two sides compete for the Jubilee Cup and Division Three teams play in the Watson Shield.

For the 2009–10 season, the teams are distributed thus:

(Levels 11-12 updated to 2021-22 season)

Premier Division
Level 11

- AFC Kempston Town & Bedford College
- AFC Oakley
- Bedford Albion
- Biggleswade F.C. Reserves
- Biggleswade United F.C. U23
- Caldecote
- Cranfield United F.C.
- Crawley Green Reserves
- Elstow Abbey
- Flitwick Town F.C.
- Marston Shelton Rovers
- Queens Park Crescents
- Riseley Sports
- Sharnbrook
- Shefford Town & Campton Reserves
- Stevington

Division One
Level 12

- Arlesey Town U23
- Barton Rovers Reserves
- Cranfield United Reserves
- Crawley Green U23
- Flitwick Town Reserves
- Henlow F.C.
- Ickwell & Old Warden F.C.
- KA Great Barford F.C.
- Lea Sports PSG
- Pitstone & Ivinghoe United Reserves
- Potton United Reserves
- Sporting Lewsey Park
- St Josephs
- Stotfold Development
- Totternhoe Reserves
- Wilstead

Division Two
Level 13

- Bromham United
- Cranfield United Reserves
- Dunton
- Eastcotts
- Marabese Ceramics
- Meltis Albion
- Oakley Sports M&DH Reserves
- Potton United Reserves
- Queens Park Crescents
- St. Joseph
- Stopsley Park
- Sundon Park Rangers
- Westoning
- Woburn Athletic

Division Three
Level 14

- Bedford Park Rangers
- Clifton
- Goldington
- Great Barford
- Ickwell & Old Warden Reserves
- Kempston Hammers Sports
- Marsh Leys
- Potton Town
- Riseley Sports
- Royal Oak Kempston
- Stevington
- Westoning Reserves
- Wilshamstead Reserves

Division Four
Level 15

- AFC Goldington
- Bedford Panthers
- Caldecote 'A'
- Clifton Reserves
- Dinamo Flitwick
- Dunton Reserves
- Elstow Abbey Reserves
- Flitwick Town Reserves
- Goldington Hammers
- Kempston Athletic
- Kempston Conservative Club Sports
- Marston Shelton Rovers Reserves
- Sandy Reserves
- Thurleigh
- Wootton Village

== Golf ==
There are a number of golf courses and clubs across Bedfordshire. Luton has two 18 hole golf courses. One in Stockwood Park and the other at Warden Hill. A driving range and 9 hole golf course can also be found at Tea Green.

== Greyhound racing ==
Greyhound racing is held at Henlow Stadium and was held at Luton Stadium (1931-1973), Queens Park Football Ground (Bedford) (1975-1982), Cardington Road (1929), Renhold (1931) and Kimbolton Road/Putnoe Lane (1931). Henlow is the only venue that was affiliated to the sports governing body the National Greyhound Racing Club, the others were known as flapping tracks, which was the nickname given to independent tracks.

== Kayaking ==
Viking Kayak Club organise the Bedford Kayak Marathon with canoe racing held along the Embankment on Bedford's riverside and organise national ranking Canoe Slalom events at the Cardington Artificial Slalom Course (CASC), which was the first artificial whitewater course in the UK. CASC is also the venue each year for the UK's National Inter Clubs Slalom Finals, the largest canoe slalom event by participation in the UK.

== Pool ==
There are two established pool leagues in Luton. One is the Luton & District Monday Pool League, which uses old style pub rules. The other is the South Beds Pool League, which competes on Thursday evenings and uses world rules. Both leagues cover the areas of Luton, Stopsley, Houghton Regis and Dunstable.

== Rowing ==
Rowing is a major part of the sports scene of Bedford, with a number of regatta events hosted throughout the year from February through to October; the most significant of these being Bedford Regatta, which in terms of numbers of crews participating is the second largest in the country.

== Rugby ==
- Bedford Teams
  - Bedford Athletic
  - Bedford Blues
  - Bedford Queens
  - Bedford Swifts
  - Bedford Tigers (Rugby League)
- Luton Teams
  - Luton Rugby Club
  - Stockwood Park
  - Vauxhall Motors RFC
- Others
  - Ampthill RUFC
  - Biggleswade Rugby Club
  - Cranfield University
  - Dunstablians
  - Kempston
  - Leighton Buzzard RFC
  - Sharnbrook and Colworth

== Other sports ==
Speedway racing was staged at Luton Stadium in the mid 1934-1937.

== Venues ==
- Bedford Autodrome Racing circuit
- Bedford International Athletics Stadium Athletics Stadium
- Creasey Park 3,200 Capacity Football Stadium
- Goldington Road 6,000 Seater Rugby Stadium#
- Henlow Stadium Greyhound racing stadium (Closed 2024)
- Kenilworth Road 10,000 Seater Football Stadium
- Wardown Park Cricket Field
