= Ooz =

Ooz or OOZ may refer to:

- Out of zone plays made, a baseball statistic
- OOZ, a work by artist Natalie Jeremijenko
- Ooz, a character in the Japanese Kamen Rider OOO TV series
- The Ooz, a 2017 album by King Krule

== See also ==
- Ooze (disambiguation)
- Ouse (disambiguation)
