= Norwich Canoe Club =

Canoe club in Norwich, England

Norwich Canoe Club logo

Norwich Canoe Club is based at Whitlingham, Trowse in Norwich, Norfolk, UK with Whitlingham Great Broad, Whitlingham Little Broad, River Yare and River Wensum nearby. It is a canoe and kayak racing club that focuses on flatwater sprint canoeing and marathon canoeing. It is a club where canoeing is safe and welcomes anyone who wants to attempt the sport. Members are all ages, ranging from 7 to 70.

The club holds the highest Top Club Gold accreditation, awarded by the British Canoe Union and Sport England, and regularly produces elite paddlers who represent Great Britain in European and international regattas and at the International Canoe Federation Canoe Sprint and Canoe Marathon World Championships.

Ian Wynne, 2004 Olympic K1 500m bronze medallist, is an honorary member of the club.

== Achievements ==
- Winners of the National Hasler Finals 2013
- Winners of the National Marathon Championships 2013
- Winners of the National Sprint Championships 2013 (the MacGregor Paddle)
- Norwich City Club of the Year 2013
- Norwich City Coach of the Year 2013 – Tim Scott, Community Coach
- Winners of the National Hasler Finals 2012
- Winners of the National Marathon Championships 2012
- Winners of the National Lightning Championships 2012
- Winners of the National Marathon Championships 2011
- BBC East Community Club of the Year 2011
- Active Norfolk Club of the Year 2011
- Norfolk Coach of the Year 2011 – Dyson Pendle, Head Coach
- Winners of the National Hasler Finals 2010
- Winners of the National Hasler Finals 2009

== Club activities ==
=== Marathon racing ===
Marathon kayak racing very similar to marathon road racing. It is an endurance sport, racing as fast as possible over distances varying from 4 to 125 miles! The regular club races are part of the Hasler Series, named after Major Herbert 'Blondie' Hasler. Competitors are seeded, based on ability, into divisions from 1 to 9. As a beginner competitors start racing in division 9, which is 4 miles. Promotion is based on time so, when as competitors get faster they are promoted to division 8 and so on. In a regional competition divisions 9, 8 and 7 races are 4 miles, 6, 5 and 4 are 8 miles and 3, 2 and 1 are 12 miles. Some races include portages, which is where competitors get out of the boat, run round an obstacle of some sort, typically a lock, before getting back in and carrying on.

=== Sprint racing ===
Sprint kayak racing is very similar to sprint track racing. It is an Olympic discipline and races are run on a regatta course of 9 lanes. Paddlers compete in 200m, 500m and 1000m events in K1s, K2s and K4s. Like marathon racing, these races are also seeded based on ability and, depending upon speed, competitors are placed in groups A to D. As a beginner competitors start in group D and as they improve their times competitors move up through to group A. Sprint regattas take place 5 times a year at the Holme Pierrepont National Watersports Centre in Nottingham, home and training ground of the Team GB Canoe Sprint Team.

=== Lightning racing (Under 10 and Under 12) ===
Those under 12 use a specific racing kayak called a Lightning. The divisions include: Under 12 boys, Under 12 girls, Under 10 boys, and Under 10 girls. Marathon lightning races are usually 2.5 miles and sprints are usually 200m and 500m. The club also has K2s and K4s for juniors that want to paddle and race with a friend.

=== Beginners ===
Everyone starts out as a beginner so the club offers Introduction to Kayaking sessions, which gets beginners to a standard were they can paddle with a group. In these sessions beginners will learn about the boats, paddling techniques and safety requirements. Once completed, they can then attend two free trial club sessions before deciding whether to fully join the club. As a member, beginners will first join the club sessions on Wednesday evenings and Saturday mornings with other people with a similar ability and follow training sessions developed by one of the 25 qualified coaches.

=== Paddle-Ability ===
The club caters for everyone, including those that are registered disabled, and has specially adapted canoes and kayaks if the paddler is unable to use a standard boat. The club focuses on each individual's abilities with one-to-one and, if needed, two-to-one coaching to help the paddler achieve their goals. Paddle-Ability paddlers can enter sprint and marathon races and represent Great Britain in the Team GB Paracanoe Squad.

=== In the community ===
Norwich Canoe Club often go out into the community and work with people of all ages and abilities who may not, otherwise, have a chance to go canoeing. As a community amateur sports club they recognise that there are barriers for some people wanting to participate in canoeing. To try to break down these barriers the club has developed a Community Outreach Programme, which offers canoeing to local groups and organisations. Club coaches and members regularly go into schools, day-care centres, public places, and fêtes to promote and demonstrate the sport, including competitions using indoor kayak machines and on-the-water taster sessions.
