= Ooze =

Ooze may refer to:

- Pelagic sediments, fine-grained sediments on the ocean floor, containing at least 30% biogenous material

== Games ==
- Ooze (Dungeons & Dragons), a type of monster in the Dungeons & Dragons role-playing game
- The Ooze, a 1995 video game by Sega Technical Institute
- A video game in the Action 52 series
- A type of monster in Bungie's Pathways Into Darkness video game
- A substance in Nicktoons: Battle for Volcano Island

== Other ==
- Ooze, by Anthony M. Rud (1923)
- Ooze, Sly Sludge's sidekick in Captain Planet and the Planeteers
- The Ooze, a substance in Teenage Mutant Ninja Turtles
- Ivan Ooze, the villain in Mighty Morphin Power Rangers: The Movie
- Slime (fantasy creature), also called oozes

== See also ==
- Slime (disambiguation)
- Ooz (disambiguation)
- Ouse (disambiguation)
