= Cardington, Bedfordshire =

Village and civil parish in England

Coordinates: 52°06′58″N 0°24′50″W

Cardington
- Village and civil parish
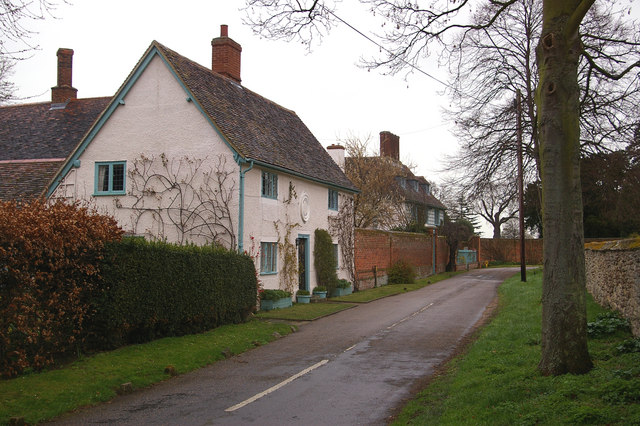
- Church Lane

- Location within Bedfordshire
- Population: 317 (2001 census); 288 (2011 Census)
- OS grid reference: TL085475
- Unitary authority: Bedford
- Ceremonial county: Bedfordshire
- Region: East
- Country: England
- Sovereign state: United Kingdom
- Post town: Bedford
- Postcode district: MK44
- Dialling code: 01234
- Police: Bedfordshire
- Fire: Bedfordshire
- Ambulance: East of England
- UK Parliament: North Bedfordshire

Cardington is a village and civil parish in the Borough of Bedford in Bedfordshire, England.

Part of the ancient hundred of Wixamtree, the settlement is best known in connection with the Cardington airship works founded by Short Brothers during World War I, which later became an RAF training station. However most of the former RAF station is actually in the parish of Eastcotts, as is the settlement of Shortstown, which was originally built by Short Brothers for its workers. The village of Cardington is located to the north east of Shortstown and the RAF station, and houses most of the population of the parish, which was 270 in 2005, making it one of the least populated parishes in Bedfordshire.

== Sites of interest ==
The Church of St Mary the Virgin has pieces dating from the 12th century, although the church itself was mostly rebuilt between 1898 and 1902. It is a Grade II listed building.

=== Airships, barrage balloons and RAF Cardington ===
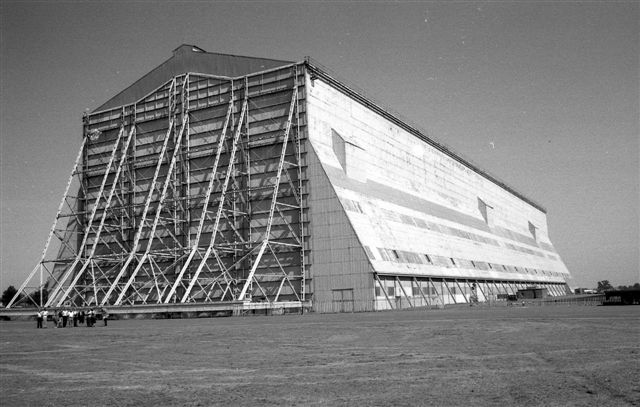
One of the two Cardington Sheds, with people in the foreground at left for scale.

Cardington became one of the major British sites involved in the development of airships when Short Brothers bought land there to build airships for the Admiralty. They constructed a 700-foot-long (210 m) airship hangar (the No. 1 Shed) in 1915 to enable them to build two rigid airships, the R-31 and the R-32. Some 800 people worked there in 1917, most of them travelled daily from Bedford. Shorts also built a housing estate, opposite the site, which they named Shortstown.

The airships site was nationalised in April 1919, becoming known as the Royal Airship Works.

In preparation for the R101 project the No 1 shed was extended between October 1924 and March 1926; its roof was raised by 35 feet and its length increased to 812 feet. The No. 2 shed (Southern shed) was originally located at RNAS Pulham, Norfolk. It was dismantled there and re-erected at Cardington in 1928.

After the crash of the R101, in October 1930, all work stopped in Britain on airships. Cardington then became a storage station.

In 1936/1937 Cardington started building barrage balloons; and it became the No. 1 RAF Balloon Training Unit.

For both airships and barrage balloons, Cardington manufactured its own hydrogen, in the Gas Factory, using the steam reforming process. In 1948 the Gas Factory became 279 MU (Maintenance Unit), RAF Cardington; and then, in 1955, 217 MU. 217 MU, RAF Cardington, produced all the gases used by the Royal Air Force until its closure in April 2000; including gas cylinder filling and maintenance.

The two airship sheds ceased being part of the RAF Cardington site in the late 1940s and they were put to other uses. The fence was moved, so they were outside the main RAF Cardington site.

From 1970, No. 2 shed was used by the Fire Research Station for large-scale fire tests in sheltered conditions which could not be carried out at their site in Borehamwood, Hertfordshire. Such tests included work on sprinklers in high-rack storage, department stores and other locations, gas explosions (following the Ronan Point disaster of 1969), and reconstructions of notable fires including the Manchester Woolworth's fire of 1979. In 1972 the Fire Research Station was merged with the Building Research Station to form the Building Research Establishment (BRE) and in the 1980s onwards some of BRE's work in non-fire areas was done in the hangar until around 2001; this included multi-storey steel, concrete and wooden buildings which were constructed and then destructively tested within the huge space available. This shed was completely reclad for BRE in the 1990s by the Property Services Agency and its contractors and thus was looked after in comparison with the other shed.

The buildings tests were mentioned during the course of the BBC series The Conspiracy Files as evidence in the controversy surrounding the collapse of World Trade Center Building 7 on 11 September 2001.

A company called Airship Industries tried to revive the fortunes of the airship industry in the other shed in the 1980s, but the efforts ended in failure. In the 2000s decade, the site was used for the development of a new design of airship, the Skycat, by the company Hybrid Air Vehicles. In the 2010s the site served as a base for Hybrid Air Vehicles' Airlander 10 prototype airship.

== Goodyear Blimps, 2011 ==
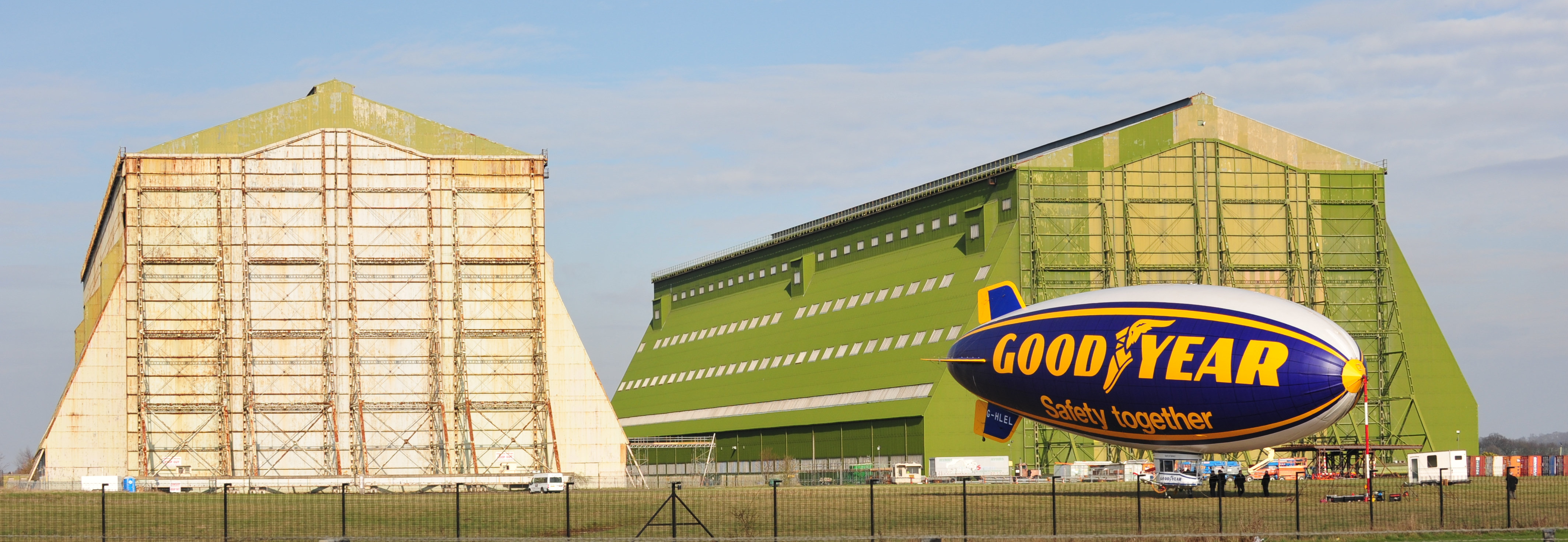
Spirit of Safety I (G-HLEL) moored at Cardington, 20 March 2011. The grey/brown semi-trailer (articulated lorry) visible under the tail was parked close to Shed 2, giving some impression of the scale of the buildings.

In early 2011 two Goodyear Blimps (Spirit of Safety I and Spirit of Safety II) were refurbished in Shed 1, prior to their deployment on a European tour promoting road safety.

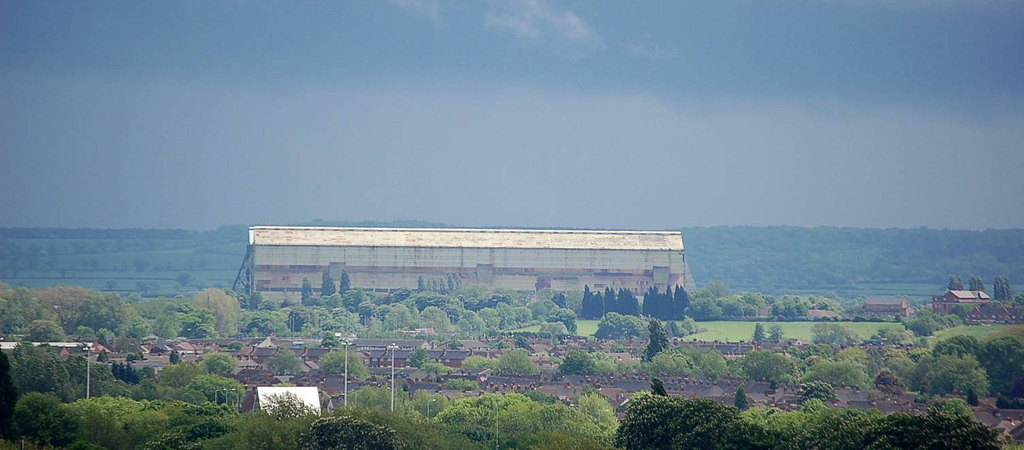
Cardington Airship Sheds (Shed 1)

== Sports ==
Cardington is the location of the two largest football clubs in Bedford Borough. Bedford Town F.C. compete at The New Eyrie stadium, and play in the Southern Football League Premier Division. Bedford F.C. use the McMullen Park stadium, and play in the Spartan South Midlands Football League Division One. Both of the football stadiums are located next to each other on Meadow Lane in Cardington.

Cardington Artificial Slalom Course is an artificial whitewater canoe slalom course located on the edge of Cardington next to Priory Country Park. The course was the first if its kind to be built in the UK, and hosts national canoe slalom competitions and cups. It is also used as a main training area for the Viking Kayak Club.

== Notable people from Cardington ==
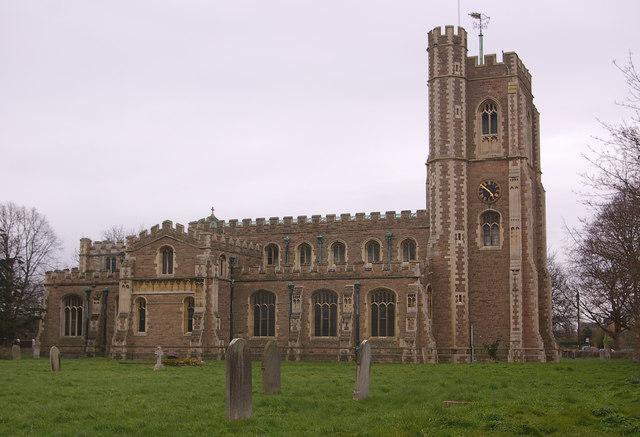
St Mary's Church

- George Gascoigne (1535–1577) – Elizabethan poet
- Samuel Whitbread (1720–1796) – brewer and MP for Bedford
- John Howard (1726–1790) – prison reformer and High Sheriff of Bedfordshire
