= Diddington Brook =

River in Cambridgeshire

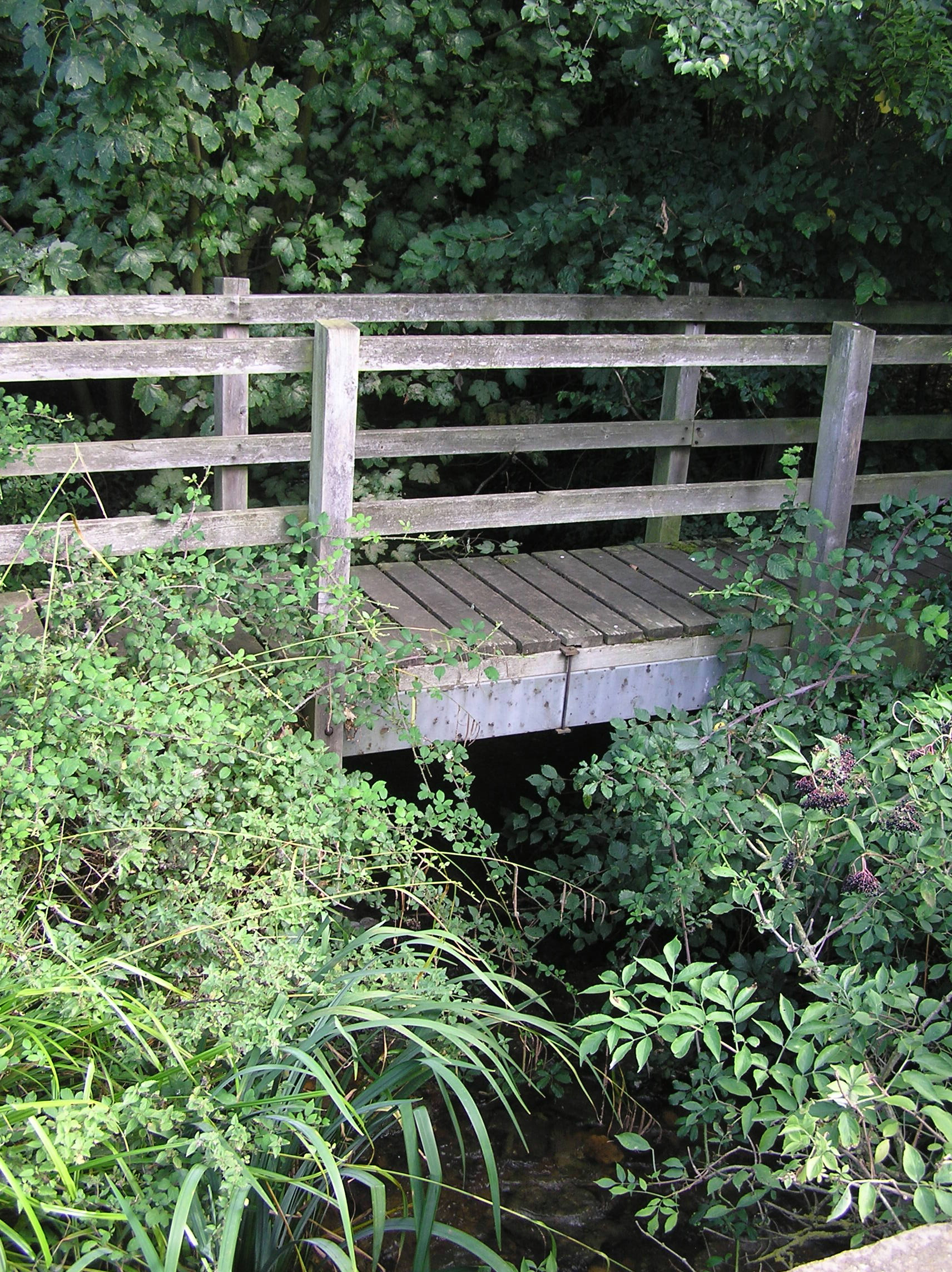
- Bridge on Diddington Brook

Location
- Constituent Country: England
- Continent: Europe
- County: Cambridgeshire

Physical characteristics
- Source: Grafham Water
- Mouth: River Great Ouse
  - location: Offord Cluny
  - coordinates: 52°17′23″N 0°13′17″W
- Length: 5.577 km (3.465 mi)

Diddington Brook is a river in Cambridgeshire, England, with a length of 5.577 km (3.465 mi) and a catchment area of 32.172 km^{2} (12.422 sq mi). Its source is at Grafham Water, which is a Site of Special Scientific Interest (SSSI).

== Course ==
Diddington Brook starts at its source at Grafham Water which is a Site of Special Scientific Interest (SSSI), flowing through the motorways of the B661 and then the A1, it meanders between Diddington and Stirtloe before joining the River Great Ouse near Offord Cluny. It has a total length of 5.577 km (3.465 mi) and a catchment area of 32.172 km^{2} (12.422 sq mi). Diddington Brook and Grafham Water are two out of the twenty bodies of the Great Ouse Lower Operational Catchment.

== History ==
A map published in the 1880s included a footbridge near Stirtloe and a farm near the brook’s mouth. The source of Diddington Brook is Grafham Water. It was created in the 1960s and supplied drinking water to the town of Milton Keynes. Grafham Water was formerly Diddington Reservoir - which was named after the brook. In 1986, Natural England designated the site as a Site of Special Scientific Interest (SSSI).

== Water quality ==
The Environment Agency measures the water quality of the river systems in England. Each is given an overall ecological status, which may be one of five levels: high, good, moderate, poor and bad. There are several components that are used to determine this, including biological status, which looks at the quantity and varieties of invertebrates, angiosperms and fish.

The water quality of the Diddington Brook system in 2019, was as follows, is listed below.

Water quality of Diddington Brook
Water Body	Water Body Type	Hydromorphological designation	Length	Ecological status	Catchment Area
Diddington Brook	River	Heavily modified	5.577 km (3.465 mi)	Good	32.172 km^{2} (12.422 sq mi)

The water quality of the Grafham Water system in 2022 was as follows.

Water Body	Ecological Status	Water body type	Altitude	Surface area	Mean depth	Catchment area	Hydromorphological designation
Grafham Water	Poor	Lake	45 m (148 ft)	6.316 km^{2} (2.439 sq mi)	9.65 m (31.7 ft)	1591.5 ha	Heavily modified
