= Hasler Series =

The Hasler Series is the British national club championship in the sport of marathon canoeing, a long distance form of canoe racing, governed by the Marathon Racing Committee and supported by British Canoeing (BC).

Racing on flat water, canoeists and kayakers compete in nine divisions and over distances of 4, 8 or 12 miles (for beginners through to advanced paddlers respectively). Paddlers may compete solo or in doubles, in kayaks (K1s and K2s) or canoes (C1s and C2s).

Points are awarded in regional races throughout the racing season and the highest ranking clubs in each region compete in the Hasler Finals for the Hasler Trophy.

The Hasler Series and Trophy are named after Major Herbert ‘Blondie’ Hasler, DSO, OBE, a distinguished Royal Marines officer in World War II who famously paddled 85 miles upstream, at night, into occupied France in a successful attempt to blow up enemy shipping and survived to tell the tale.

The Hasler Trophy was presented by Lloyd's of London underwriters to commemorate Operation Frankton, the raid of the so-called 'Cockleshell Heroes', led by Major Hasler. The Hasler Trophy has been competed for since 1957.

Major Hasler died in 1987 and Marine Bill Sparks, his wartime paddling partner, died on 30 November 2002, only ten days short of the sixtieth anniversary of the raid. In 2003 the British Canoe Union (BCU) Marathon Committee decided to inaugurate a new trophy named in honour of Bill Sparks, which goes to the highest placed veteran K2 in the highest division at the Hasler Final.

== Hasler Final events ==
The Marathon Racing Committee is responsible for choosing a host club to organise and run the Hasler Final event each year. In recent years attempts have been made to encourage a wider variety of clubs who have not regularly hosted this event to become involved.

Year	Location	Organisers	Results
2026		Richmond CC	—
2025	River Severn at Worcester Racecourse	Worcester CC	—
2024	(Cancelled due to river conditions)	Richmond CC	—
2023	River Severn at Worcester Racecourse	Worcester CC	—
2022	River Thames at Runnymede	Wey KC	—
2021	(Cancelled due to COVID-19 restrictions)	—	—
2020	(Cancelled due to COVID-19 restrictions)	Richmond CC	—
2019	River Hamble at Fairthorne Manor	Southampton CC	Full results
2018	River Yare & Whitlingham Great Broad at Whitlingham Country Park, Norwich	Norwich CC	Full results
2017	River Thames at Ham Riverside	Richmond CC	Full results
2016	River Severn at Worcester	Worcester CC	Full results
2015	River Thames at Wolvercote	Falcon CC	Full results
2014	River Thames at Ham Riverside	Richmond CC	Full results
2013	River Thames at Reading	Reading CC	Full results
2012	River Thames at Thames Valley Park	Wokingham CC & Banbury CC	Full results
2011	River Great Ouse at Bedford	Bedford CC	Full results
2010	River Severn at Worcester	Worcester CC	Full results
2009	River Thames at Reading	Reading CC	Full results
2008	River Trent at Burton upon Trent	Burton CC	Not available
2007	River Thames at Pangbourne	Pangbourne CC	Full results
2006 (50th year)	River Great Ouse at Bedford College, Bedford	Viking Kayak Club & Leighton Buzzard CC	1. Reading CC; 2. Elmbridge CC
2005	River Yare at Whitlingham Country Park, Norwich	Norwich CC	
2004	River Trent at Holme Pierrepont, Nottingham	Nottingham CC	Full results
2003	River Thames at Reading	Reading CC	Full results
2002	River Thames at Dorney Lake, Windsor	Wey KC	Full results
2001	River Thames at Pangbourne	Pangbourne CC	Full results
2000	River Trent at Nottingham	Nottingham CC	Full results

== Operation Frankton ==
One of the most daring raids of World War II took place on the night of 11 December 1942 in the enemy-occupied port of Bordeaux in France. Operation Frankton involved 12 men in six canoes being taken by submarine to a position 10 miles south of the Gironde estuary on 7 December.

One of the canoes was ripped passing through the hatch of the submarine, but the other five then had an 85-mile paddle ahead of them. Two boats were lost in the tidal race and the remaining three carried on for three days, paddling in darkness and lying up during the day. One more boat hit a submerged rock and sank and the final two boats went on to Bordeaux harbour, where they attached their limpet mines and, assisted by the ebb tide, paddled silently back down the river. The mines detonated and severely damaged four vessels and sunk one.

The four remaining men beached before reaching the sea, scuttled their canoes and travelled overland to try to reach safety. Two were captured, but Major ‘Blondie’ Hasler and Marine Bill Sparks made their way to Spain – the only two of the original ten who survived.

Hasler was awarded the DSO and Sparks the DSM.

== The Cockleshell Heroes ==
In a fictionalised version of the true story of the canoe raid, Operation Frankton became the subject of The Cockleshell Heroes, a 1955 Second World War film with Trevor Howard, Anthony Newley, David Lodge and José Ferrer, who also directed.
