= Ouse Bridge =

Ouse Bridge may refer to:

- Ouse Bridge, York, a historic bridge in the centre of the city of York, England
- Ouse Bridge (M62), a bridge carrying the M62 motorway over the River Ouse near Goole, England
- Ouse Bridge railway station, a short-lived railway station in Norfolk, England

== See also ==
- Ouse (disambiguation)
