= Nene Whitewater Centre =

White water sports venue near Northampton, England

Coordinates: 52.2285°N 0.8684°W

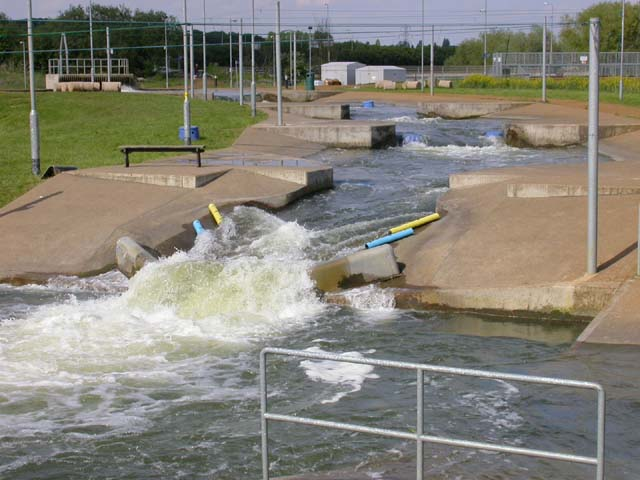
The course

The Nene Whitewater Centre is a whitewater centre which was the UK's first pumped artificial whitewater course. It is located on the River Nene in Northampton.

The 300m course was designed by slalom designers, Proper Channels Ltd and built in 1999 by Wrekin Construction. Water can be partially diverted around a weir via an automatically controlled sluice gate. Additionally, three individually controlled electric pumps allow the centre to pump water from below the weir into the course. The course can be configured to cater for novices, or intermediates.

== See also ==
Other UK artificial whitewater centres

- Lee Valley White Water Centre
- Cardington Artificial Slalom Course
- Holme Pierrepont National Watersports Centre
- Tees Barrage International White Water
- Cardiff International White Water
