= Out of zone plays made =

Out of zone plays made, known by the acronym OOZ, is a baseball statistic used to measure a baseball player's performance on defense.

The sabermetrics statistic is also a component other baseball statistics, including the Zone Rating and Revised Zone Rating (RZR) measures of a baseball player's defensive performance. It was developed by sports statistician John Dewan in the 1980s, and then enhanced by him in 2006.

OOZ reflects the number of plays a fielder makes on balls that were hit outside his "zone". A player's "zone", for purposes of the definition, is considered those parts of the field in which on average a fielder is able to convert half of his chances into outs.

== See also ==
- Rawlings Gold Glove Award winners
