= Cardington Artificial Slalom Course =

White water sports course in England

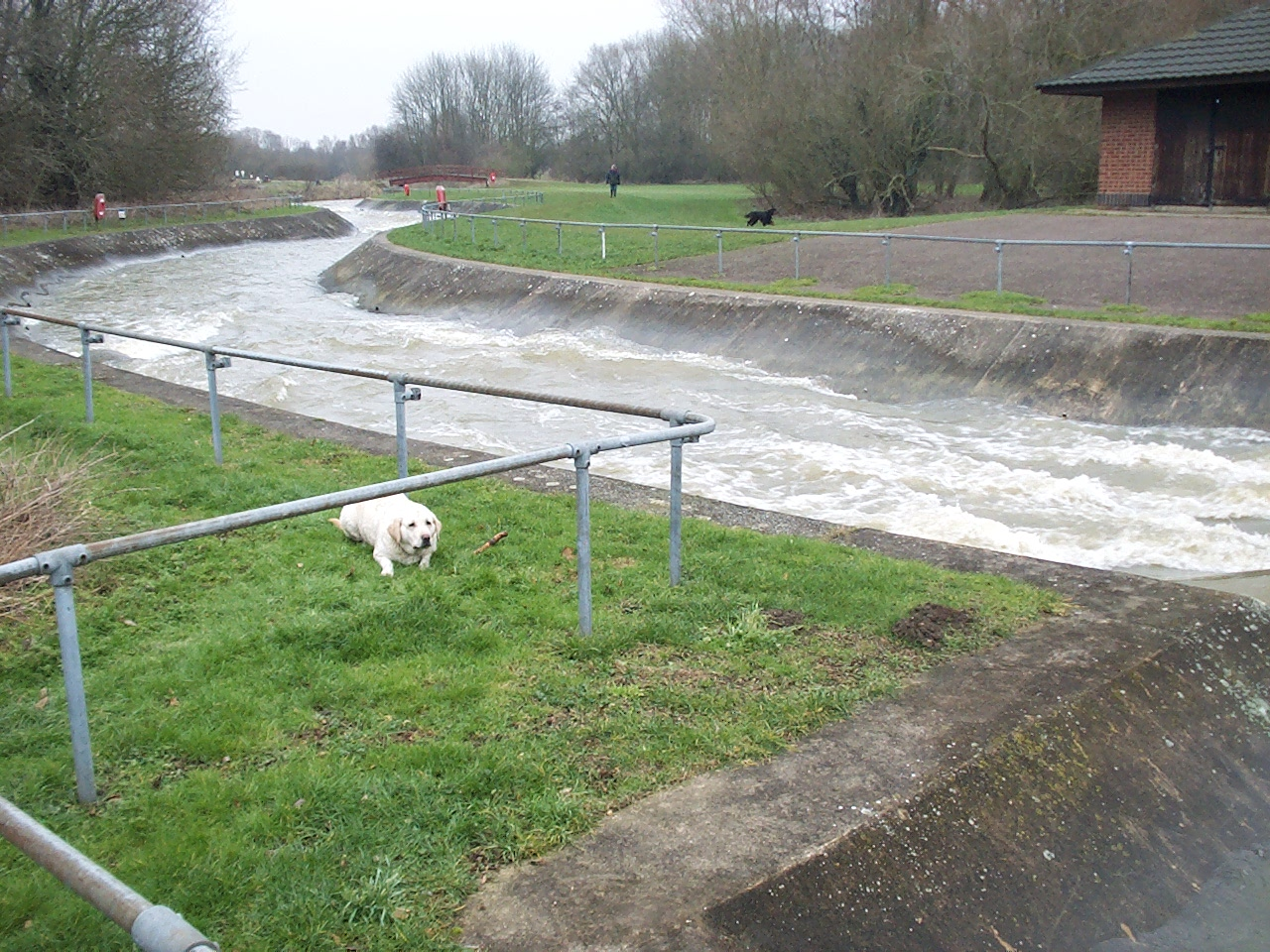
- The course being used as flood overflow

- Location within Bedfordshire Location within the United Kingdom
- Location: Cardington, Bedfordshire, England
- Coordinates: 52°7′37.42″N 0°25′44.03″W
- Type: Artificial whitewater canoe slalom course
- Event: Sport

Construction
- Opened: July 1982
- Cost: £273,000

Cardington Artificial Slalom Course (CASC) was the first artificial whitewater canoe slalom course in the UK when it was completed in July 1982, having been first discussed in 1972.

== Artificial whitewater ==
Based on the River Great Ouse adjacent to Cardington sluice, within the grounds of Priory Country Park and approximately 2.5 km downstream from Bedford, the course has a dual role as both a flood control structure and a whitewater course for canoe slalom training and events.

The course cost £273,000 and was funded by a consortium of the Ministry of Agriculture, Fisheries and Food (now the Environment Agency), Anglian Water, the Sports Council (now UK Sport) and local councils and was seen as an excellent example of the relatively low cost adaptation of a necessary structure to provide a facility of national significance.

The structure consists of an automatically controlled dropleaf control sluice, 9 metres wide, at the head of a concrete-lined channel which connects the upper reach of the river to the lower. The channel is 120 m long with a bed slope of 1:100. To create the required water flow pattern, fibreglass boulders known as "hippos" and "dollies" are secured to the base of the channel. The maximum head is 1.7 m with a maximum water capacity of 15 cubic metres per second.

Originally seen primarily as a training venue, the course also holds two national ranking canoe slalom competitions per year at up to Division 2 level, and is the host every year to the Inter Clubs Final, which pits teams from all the top canoe slalom clubs against each other for an overall trophy. Running all weekend with camping overnight, the Inter Clubs is the largest canoe slalom event in the UK (by number of participants), a great social event for the sport and one of the highlights of the UK slalom calendar.

The course celebrated its 25th anniversary in September 2007 with a visit by Frank Branston the Mayor of Bedford. The original project's vision of becoming 'a regional centre for canoeing' has come to fruition.

Competition events at CASC are organised by Bedford's Viking Kayak Club which also organises national ranking events and finals in kayak marathon. Viking celebrated its 50th anniversary in 2011.

== Other UK artificial whitewater centres ==
- Lee Valley White Water Centre
- Holme Pierrepont National Watersports Centre
- Nene Whitewater Centre
- Tees Barrage White Water Course
