= Tom Clark (cricketer, born 1924) =

English cricketer (1924–1981)

Personal information
- Full name: Thomas Henry Clark
- Born: 5 October 1924; Luton, Bedfordshire, England
- Died: 14 June 1981 (aged 56); Luton, Bedfordshire, England
- Batting: Right-handed
- Bowling: Right-arm offbreak
- Role: Opening batsman

Domestic team information
- Years: Team
- 1947–1959: Surrey
- FC debut: 27 August 1947 Surrey v Leicestershire
- Last FC: 12 October 1959 Surrey v Rhodesia

Career statistics
Competition	First-class
Matches	263
Runs scored	11,490
Batting average	29.38
100s/50s	12/58
Top score	191
Balls bowled	5,805
Wickets	75
Bowling average	30.85
5 wickets in innings	1
10 wickets in match	0
Best bowling	5/23
Catches/stumpings	105/–
- Source: CricketArchive, 24 November 2007

Thomas Henry Clark (5 October 1924 – 14 June 1981) was an English cricketer. He played for Surrey as an opening batsman. His career with them took in the period from 1952 to 1958 when they won an unequalled seven successive County Championship titles.

He began with the Minor County Bedfordshire, that being the county of his birth, and played three matches for them in August 1946. He then joined Surrey. He played in only six first-class matches in total between 1947 and 1949, but made a big advance in 1950 when he played in 19 matches, scored his maiden century and averaged 31.37. He had a poor season the following year and appeared in only 11 matches, but in 1952 he reached 1,000 runs in a season for the first time, averaged 36.15 and was awarded his county cap. From then on he was a regular member of the side until worsening arthritis meant that after 1959 he was no longer fit enough for first-class cricket. He had two poor seasons in 1955 and 1958, but otherwise reached 1,000 runs every year, making six times in all. When he made his highest score of 191 against Kent at Blackheath in 1956, he put on 174 in two hours with Peter May for the third wicket.

He was a useful off-spinner, but his opportunities with the ball were limited by the presence in the Surrey side of Jim Laker and Eric Bedser.

Before concentrating on cricket, he played football for Aston Villa, appearing in their reserve team. In May 1948 he moved to Walsall, for whom he scored three goals in nine first team games in the Third Division (South). He played as an inside forward.
