= Ouse =

Ouse (/uːz/ OOZ) may refer to:

== Places ==
=== Rivers in England ===
- River Ouse, Yorkshire
- River Ouse, Sussex
- River Great Ouse, Northamptonshire and East Anglia
  - River Little Ouse, a tributary of the River Great Ouse

=== Other places ===
- Ouse, Tasmania, a town in Australia
- The Ouse, an estuary on Shapinsay, in the Orkney Islands, Scotland
- Grand River (Ontario), Canada, formerly known as the Ouse

== Ships ==
- MV River Ouse, an Empire F type coaster in service with R H Hunt & Sons, Hull, 1947-52
- HMS Ouse (1905), a River-class destroyer of 1905

== See also ==
- Ouse Bridge (disambiguation)
- Oise a department in northern France
- Oise (river), a river in Belgium and northern France
- Ouseburn, a river in Tyne and Wear, England
- List of rivers of the United Kingdom
