= Artificial whitewater =

Artificially created water sports venue

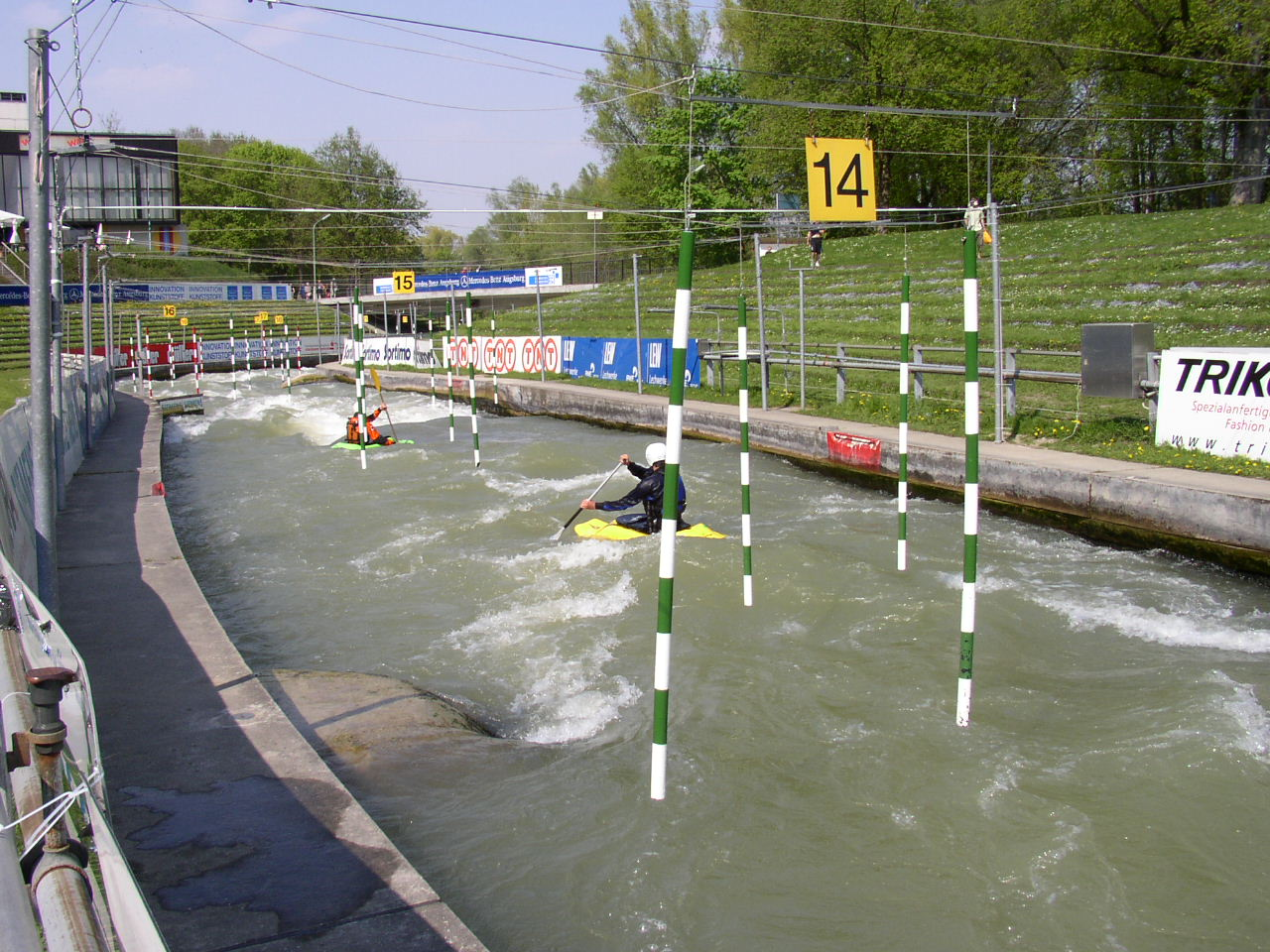
Eiskanal in Augsburg, Germany

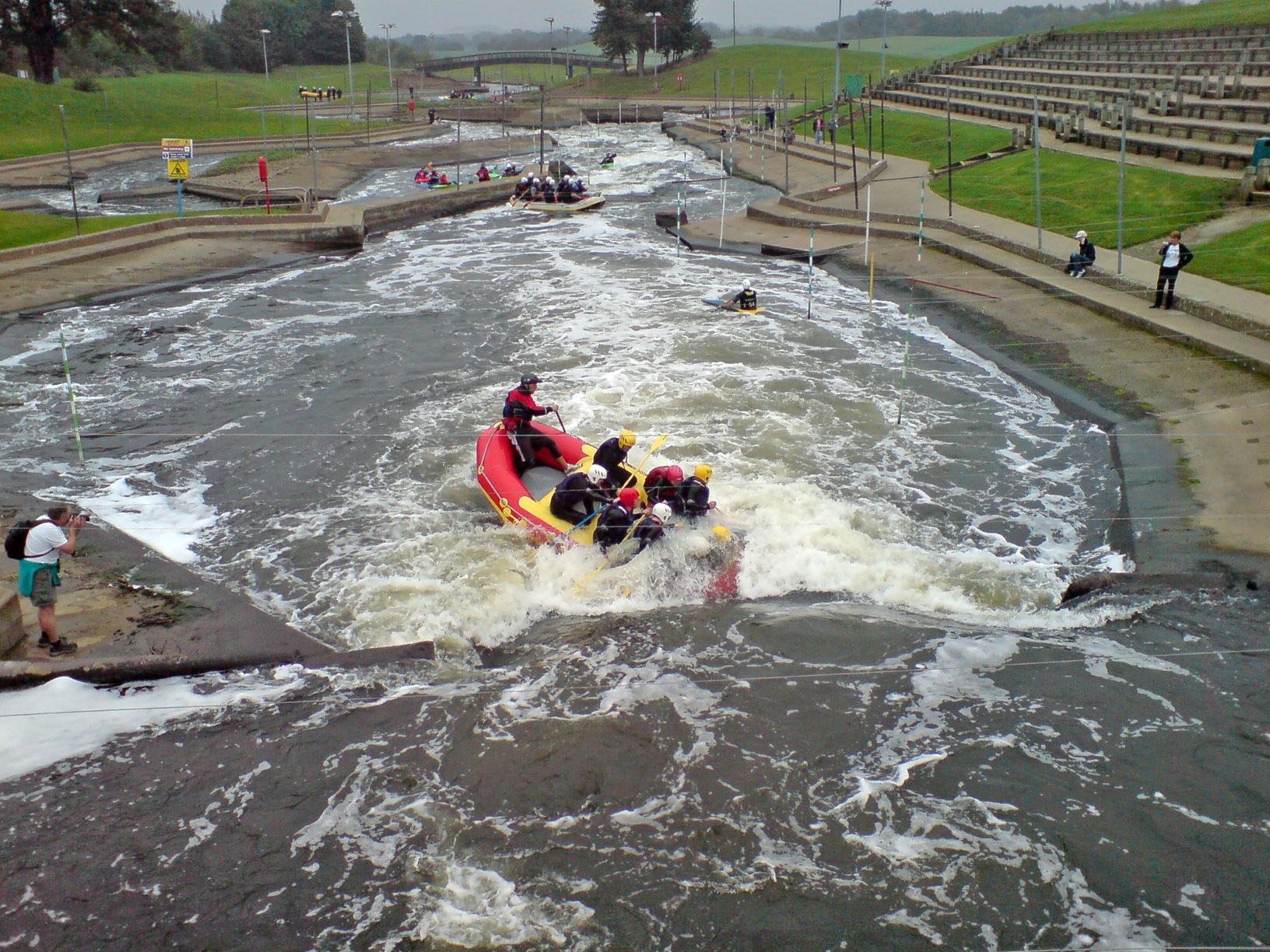
Kayaking and Rafting at Holme Pierrepont, England

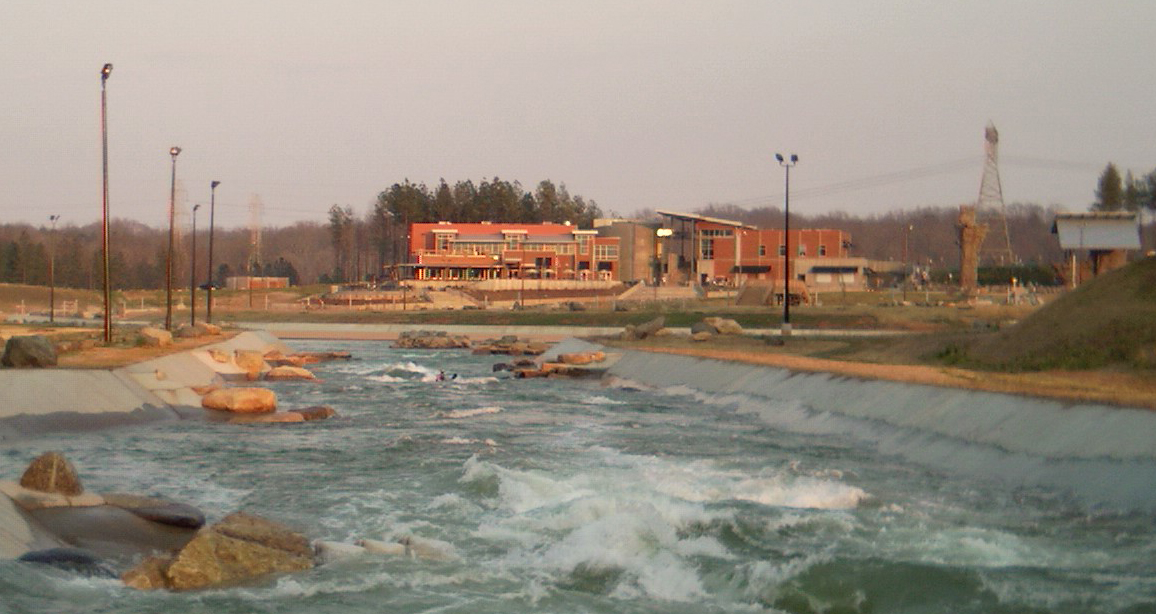
U.S. National Whitewater Center in Charlotte, North Carolina

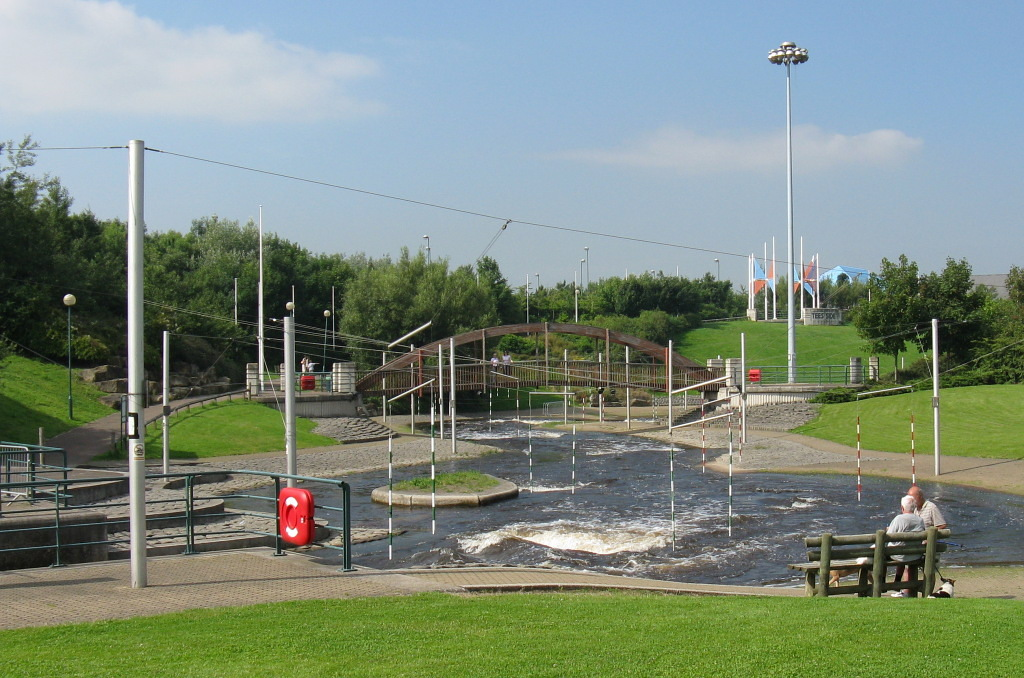
The Tees Barrage International White Water Course

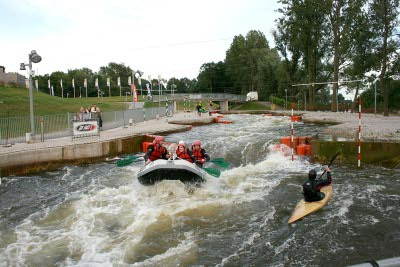
Rafting and canoeing at Dutch Water Dreams

An artificial whitewater course is a site for whitewater canoeing, whitewater kayaking, whitewater racing, whitewater rafting, playboating and slalom canoeing with artificially generated rapids.

== Course types ==
Main types of course:

=== Flow diversion ===
These work by diverting a natural river through boulder placement or damming, or by creating new channels next to an existing river, possibly by a weir or power station outflow.

=== Tidal action ===
Created in estuaries with large tidal reaches, on a barrage across the river. The barrage is opened during a rising high tide to allow the sea water in, then shut as the tide turns. The water stored above the barrage is then forced through an artificial channel to provide water features.

=== Pumped ===
The nature of artificial whitewater courses necessitates the need for a drop in the river, and enough water flow to provide hydraulics. When this isn't possible (often in flat low-lying areas), electric pumps are used to lift and re-circulate the water to the top of the course. The shapes of these courses are commonly circular or U-shaped.

Pumped courses are extremely expensive to run, typically 1-2 megawatts of electrical power are needed to pump 15 cubic metres per second of water down a course with a 5-meter drop in height.

=== Altered riverbed ===
These courses are created in existing natural river channels, but are enhanced with strategic placement of new rocks, boulders or concrete structures. Some are downstream of river or channel wide dams and therefore have some level of flow optimization, others are subject to seasonal flows.

== Olympic whitewater courses ==
- 1972 - Augsburg Eiskanal in Augsburg, Germany — flow diversion
- 1992 - Segre Olympic Park in La Seu d'Urgell, Spain — flow diversion/pumped
- 1996 - Ocoee Whitewater Center near Copperhill, Tennessee, United States — altered riverbed
- 2000 - Penrith Whitewater Stadium, near Sydney, Australia — pumped
- 2004 - Hellinikon Olympic Canoe/Kayak Slalom Centre, Athens, Greece — pumped
- 2008 - Shunyi Olympic Rowing-Canoeing Park, Beijing, China — pumped
- 2012 - Lee Valley White Water Centre, London, England — pumped
- 2016 - Deodoro Olympic Whitewater Stadium, Rio de Janeiro, Brazil — pumped
- 2021 - Kasai Canoe Slalom Centre, Tokyo, Japan — pumped
- 2024 - Vaires-sur-Marne Nautical Stadium, Vaires-sur-Marne, France — pumped
- 2028 - Riversport Rapids Whitewater Center, Oklahoma City, United States

== Other notable courses ==
- Adventure Sports Center International in McHenry, Maryland, United States — pumped
- Canolfan Tryweryn near Bala, Gwynedd, North Wales — natural flow modifications
- Cardington Artificial Slalom Course near Bedford, England — flow diversion
- Dickerson Whitewater Course in Dickerson, Maryland, United States — pumped
- Dutch Water Dreams in Zoetermeer, Netherlands — pumped
- Holme Pierrepont in Nottingham, England — flow diversion
- U.S. National Whitewater Center, near Charlotte, North Carolina, United States — pumped
- Nene Whitewater Centre in Northampton, England — pumped
- Rutherford Creek in British Columbia, Canada — flow diversion
- Tacen Whitewater Course near Ljubljana, Slovenia — flow diversion
- Tees Barrage International White Water Course in Stockton-on-Tees, England — converted from tidal to pumped in 2010/2011
- Čunovo Water Sports Centre near Čunovo, Slovakia — flow diversion
- Canal de aguas bravas, Zaragoza, Aragon, Spain
- Al Ain Adventure in Al Ain, Abu Dhabi, United Arab Emirates — pumped

== See also ==
- List of artificial whitewater courses
