= Viking Kayak Club =

Water sports club in Bedford, England

Viking Kayak Club is an open, community-based, multi-disciplinary club and is now one of the foremost canoe and kayak clubs in the UK. The club offers a broad range of paddling opportunities from easy recreational paddling to competition in canoe slalom, canoe racing and canoe polo and is active in encouraging beginners into the sport.

Viking was founded in 1961 and celebrated its 50th anniversary in 2011. Its clubhouse is at Batts Ford on the north bank of the River Great Ouse in the centre of Bedford, England.

In 2009, Viking was named the British Canoe Union (BCU)’s Club of the Year and was Runner Up in the overall UK Sports Club of the Year run by The Central Council of Physical Recreation (CCPR). Viking is also accredited under Sport England’s Clubmark scheme and by the BCU as Top Club Gold, the highest level of canoe club accreditation.

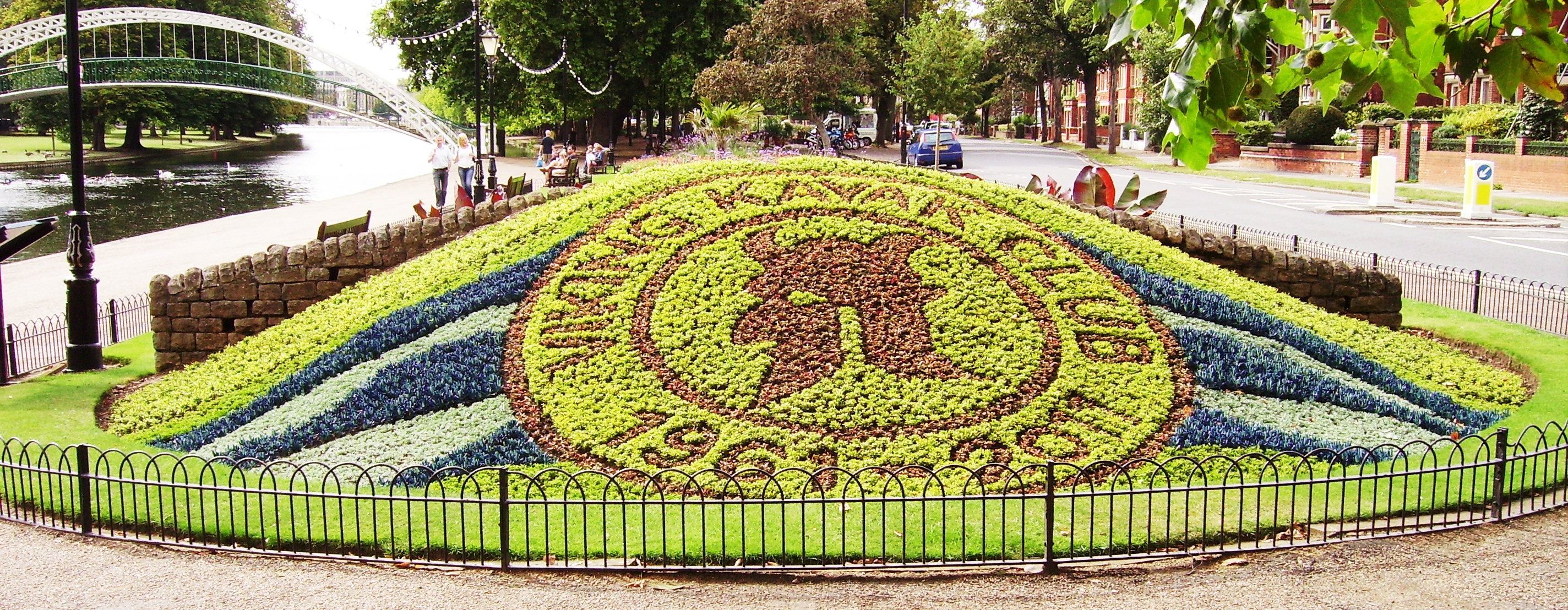
Floral display on Bedford Embankment celebrating the club.

== Membership ==
The club is open to all from the age of eight upwards and welcomes families and adults of all ages to take part in canoeing and kayaking sport and recreation. All forms of paddling are supported.

The club has equipment available to beginners and runs a range of courses from beginner level through to more advanced paddling and even for those wishing to become a coach. It also runs specialist training in slalom, polo and racing as well as the opportunity to meet with like–minded people and go on trips at weekends etc. From around Easter through to the Summer each year, Viking runs a Kids Club and a Paddlesport Academy based on Canoe England’s Paddle Power scheme.

== Events ==
Viking runs several events and national ranking competitions each year. These have included the National Marathon championships, the Hasler Series National Finals, and UK Junior and Veteran Slalom championships.

Events in 2014 will include:

- 2nd Etienne Stott White Water Arena Slalom 9 March
- 62nd Annual Bedford Kayak Marathon, Sunday 4 May
- Annual ‘Come and Try it’ event, Bank Holiday Monday 5 May
- Slalom weekend (national ranking event Division 2/3/4), at Cardington Artificial Slalom Course, 14/15 June
- Bedford River Festival (Viking will run various demonstration events), 19/20 July
- Slalom weekend (national ranking event Division 2/3/4), at Cardington Artificial Slalom Course, 30/31 August
- UK Canoe Slalom Inter Clubs final, at Cardington Artificial Slalom Course (organised by the BCU Slalom committee), 6/7 September
- 50th Annual Boxing Day Roll, 26 December, Roll happens at precisely 11:30

== History ==
The club's name is named after the Viking raiding activity that is known to have taken place on the River Great Ouse at what is now Bedford. For centuries the river has been used to transport goods and people but by the twentieth century the river was increasingly used for leisure.

Canoeing and kayaking have taken place in Bedford for many years and in the early 1900s, open canoes were available for hire alongside punts and rowing boats from commercial boathouses along Bedford's riverside.

Canoes started to be used in races and in May 1951, the first Bedford to St. Neots canoe race took place to encourage the restoration of navigation between the two towns which at that time was impassable by most boats. The race was the first of its kind in the country and is still run annually, as the Bedford Canoe and Kayak Marathon. It now takes place on a circular circuit around the Victorian Embankment in Bedford's town centre and is part of the Eastern Region Hasler marathon series, generally taking place at the end of April or beginning of May.

In 1961, following the success of the Bedford to St Neots race, Viking Kayak Club was established by canoeing friends Brian Sidaway, David Green and John Mathers and moved into premises shared with Star Rowing Club.

From the start, Viking members have also used the white water created by Bedford's weirs and in particular Duck Mill sluices, in Bedford's town centre, which is ideal for white water training. National ranking slalom competitions have also been held here and this was the first venue at which 5 time world slalom champion Richard Fox (canoeist) competed. Duck Mill has also been the setting for Viking's annual Boxing Day Roll, which has been taking place annually since 1964 and sees the return of many former Viking paddlers each year.

From 1972 Viking members collaborated with the water and environmental authorities to develop a plan for a combined scheme allowing improved flood relief with the UK's first artificial slalom course. Opened in 1982, Cardington Artificial Slalom Course was originally seen primarily as a regional training venue. Now, the course also holds two national ranking canoe slalom competitions per year at up to Division 2 level, and is the host every year to the Inter Clubs Final, which pits teams from all the top canoe slalom clubs against each other for an overall trophy. Running all weekend with camping overnight, the Inter Clubs is the largest canoe slalom event in the UK (by number of participants), a great social event for the sport and one of the highlights of the UK slalom calendar.

Since 1981 Viking has taken part in the twin town Sports Festival held every four years between Bedford and Bamberg, Germany, competing against their counterparts the Bamberg Faltboot Club (BFC). In 1994 BFC member Jurgen Hoh paddled all the way from Bamberg to Bedford in a traditional folding kayak (faltboot in German).

In 2011, Viking celebrated its Golden Anniversary with a number of special events; it hosted the Hasler National Finals (with Leighton Buzzard CC), ran the first annual Bedford Canoe Polo tournament and completed a 50-mile charity paddle with Paddle 4 Good. To finish the year in style the club held a Golden Anniversary Ball at the Swan Hotel, Bedford, with former members attending from around the country.

In 2012, Viking celebrates further anniversaries - the 60th annual Bedford Kayak Marathon, part of the Hasler Series, and the 30th anniversary of the opening of the Cardington Artificial Slalom Course. The club also joined in partnership with the Environment Agency and the Bedford Borough Council to launch the new Duck Mill White Water Arena, based at the Duck Mill weir in Bedford town centre, which formalises the over 50 years of paddling heritage at the site and features permanent slalom poles.

Viking has a proud record of producing some excellent paddlers, including C2 Slalom canoeist Etienne Stott, who with partner Tim Baillie has won medals at world cup events, the European Championships (Nottingham 2009) and came fourth at the 2009 ICF Canoe Slalom World Championships in La Seu d'Urgell. Etienne and Tim have also won team medals together with the other UK C2 boats, at the European Championships (Silver in 2009, Bronze in 2010 and Gold in 2012) and at the World Championships (Bronze in 2009 and 2011). Etienne was named Bedford Sports Personality of the Year in 2008.

Etienne Stott and Tim Baillie were named in the Team GB Olympic squad for the London 2012 Olympic Games following the selection races at the Lee Valley Olympic Slalom course. Team GB included just 5 athletes competing in the four events: Men's K1, C1 and C2 and Ladies' K1. Etienne Stott and Tim Baillie went on to win C2 Slalom Olympic Gold Medal in the London 2012 Olympic Games.

== Governance ==
The club is a Community Amateur Sports Club and is affiliated to the British Canoe Union (BCU). Viking is also accredited under Sport England's ClubMark scheme and by the BCU as Top Club Gold, the highest level of canoe club accreditation. It is run by a club committee and holds its AGM every year in November.

The club produces a member newsletter called ‘The Paddler’ which is distributed to current and former members and friends of the club.
