= Canoeing and kayaking in India =

- Country: India
- Governing body: Indian Kayaking and Canoeing Association
- National team: India

Canoeing and kayaking in India has become a popular sport. The Indian Kayaking and Canoeing Association (IKCA) is the governing body of the sport in India.

== Flat water and sea kayaking ==
Flat-water kayaking takes place in rivers, lakes and the ocean. Aside from professional flat water kayaking, there is very limited recreational kayaking. Historically, Indian tourists considered kayaking a one-time activity and not a competitive sport.

Long distance flat water kayaking can be done in Mulki, India. Participants from Bangalore, Mangalore, Udupi etc. come to participate in 30 km kayaking and camping adventure.

== Whitewater kayaking ==
Whitewater kayaking is a niche sport with some hardcore following. While the Himalayan rivers are teeming with largely commercial kayakers and some weekend adventurers, in south it is largely the weekend kayakers who have been driving the sport. Bangalore, Karnataka has seen the largest spike in weekend paddlers. However, paddling in India, in general is plagued by limited availability of gear locally, police and bureaucratic interference (who view kayakers with suspicion, since it is an alien activity), and commercial rafters who feel threatened by the presence of the kayakers on the rivers where they have permits to commercially raft.

== Sea Kayaking ==
Sea kayaking is new to India. Considering the vast coastline of India, extremely fewer people do sea kayaking. Kaustubh Khare holds the long-distance record of kayaking west coast of India on a kayak. Few other individuals have also kayaked the coastline of Kerala, Mumbai to Goa, Karnataka and Gujarat.

== Competitive canoeing and kayaking ==
Meghalaya hosted the Indian kayaking and canoeing selection trials for the 2024 Canoe Slalom World Cup. The National Canoe Slalom and Kayak Cross Championship was held in Karnataka in 2024. India's Arjun Singh and Sunil Singh Salam won bronze for India in the Men's Double 1000m Canoeing at the 2023 Asian Games.
