= Kaustubh =

Kaustubh may refer to

- Kaustubha, a divine gemstone attributed to the deity Vishnu
- Kaustubh Khade (born 1987), Indian kayaker
- Kaustubh Pawar (born 1990), Indian cricketer
