= Tuilik =

Watertight jacket used when paddling a kayak

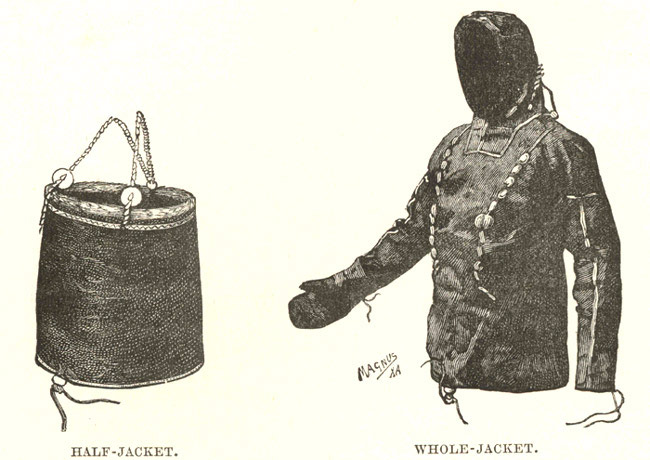
Traditional West Greenland sealskin akuilisaq (left) and tuilik (right), ~1893 drawing.

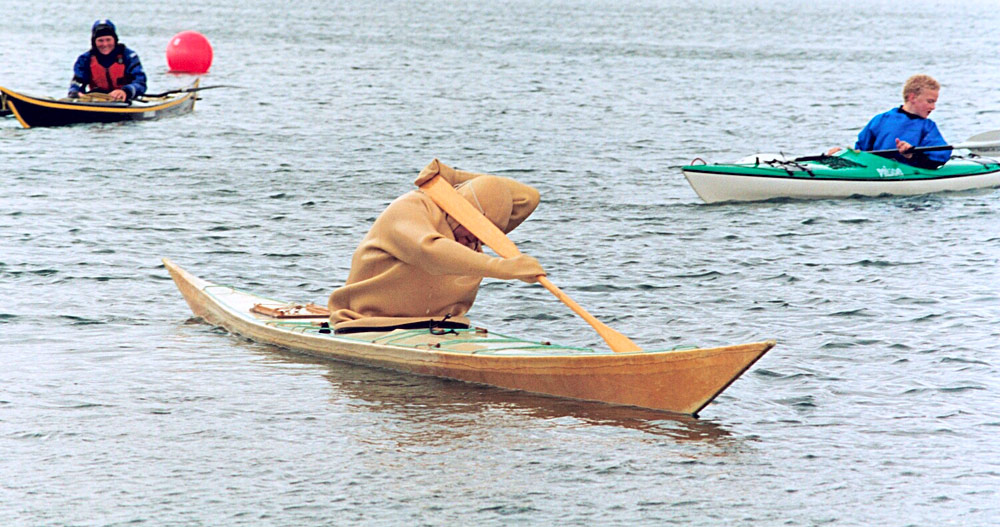
A kayaker wearing a tuiliusaq (modern neoprene tuilik), in the starting position for a siukkut tunusummillugu rolling exercise.

A tuilik is an Inuit watertight jacket, used when paddling a kayak. It is sealed at the face, at the wrists and around the cockpit coaming. In this way the paddler can capsize and come back upright (using an Eskimo Rescue or kayak roll) without getting wet, and without getting any water into the kayak.

The air trapped in a tuilik makes rolling easier. If the paddler comes out of their kayak, a tuilik provides considerable initial buoyancy, and the legs may be drawn up into the air pocket. A flotation device may be worn over or under a tuilik or tuiliusaq.

In summer months an akuilisaq (a spray skirt or spray deck) may be used instead.

Many kayakers do not use a tuilik, but instead a separate spray skirt and kayaking top (often a drytop, something like a drysuit jacket), which usually seals around the waist, arms, and neck. A tuilik integrates the skirt and top into one piece of clothing, with a hood-edge seal rather than a neck seal. Tuiliks are generally less restrictive of motion, but the fit is finnickier.

== Fit ==
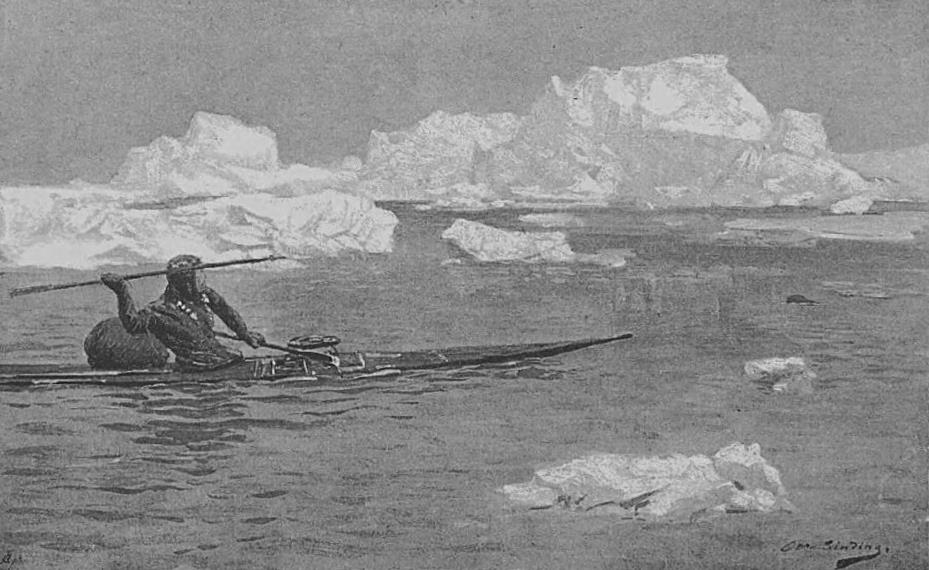
A hunter in 1891 wearing a sealskin tuilik with a traditional narrow fit.

The hood must fit snugly, but the arms and body fit loosely to allow free movement and clothing underneath. Rolling requires extra length in the torso. Quick-release suspenders were traditionally used to lift the front and prevent water from pooling in the excess length. The tuilik must seal at the face and kayak cockpit coaming, and usually at the wrists (unless there are integrated mittens, as in the tuilikusaq image above).

Traditional tuiliks are narrower, to fit narrow custom-fitted cockpits; mass-produced kayaks have larger cockpits (including long keyhole cockpits, image comparison) and the tuilik must therefore be wider at the hem. Some tuiliks are made with double decks to fit a range of cockpits.

Commercial tuiliks may be custom-fitted or made in a broad range of off-the-peg shapes and sizes (one manufacturer stocks 15 sizes).

Some kayakkers make tuiliks by sewing or gluing commercial drytops and sprayskirts/spraydecks together, with a permanent waterproof join.

== Materials and manufacture ==
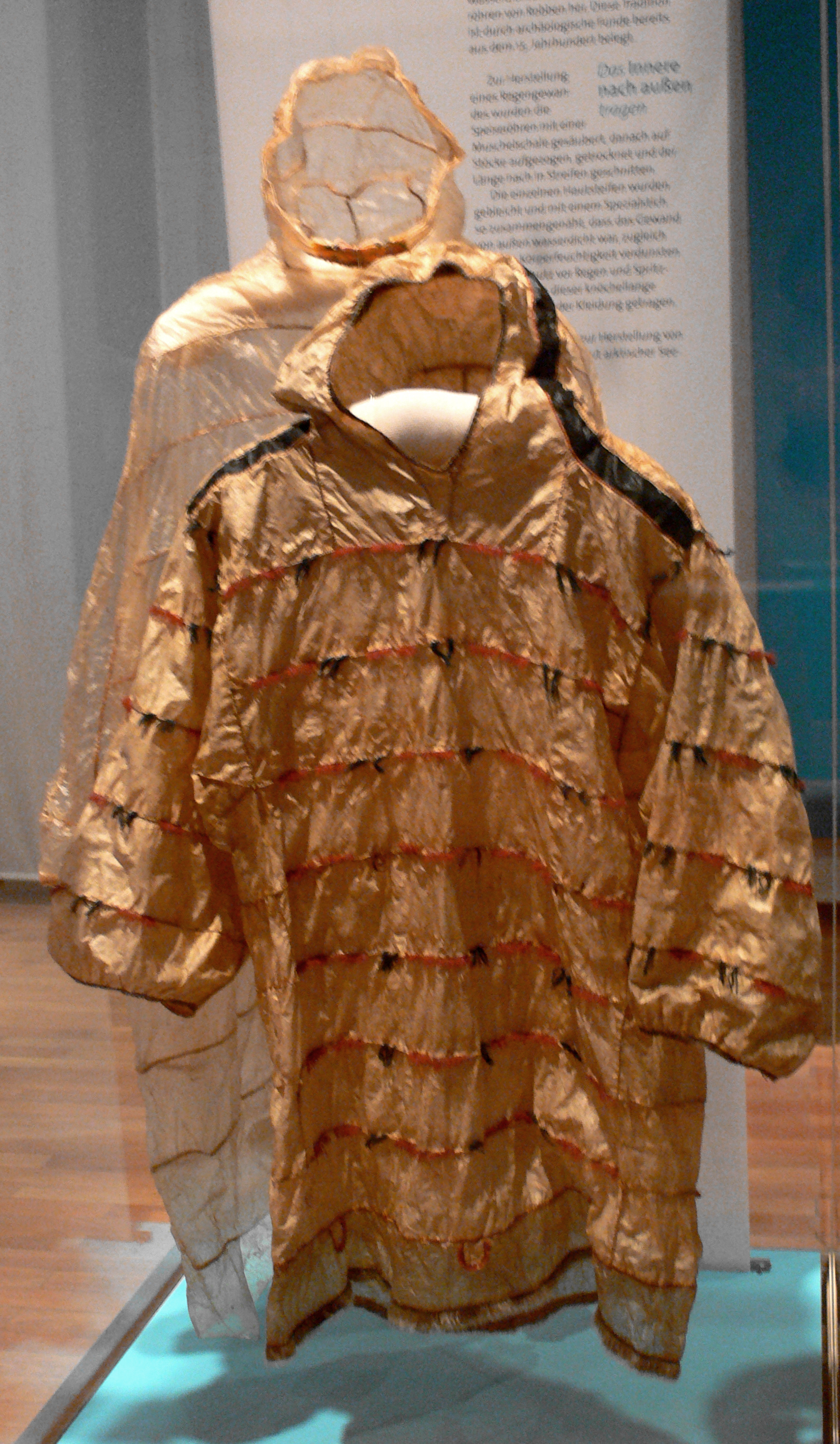
Seal intestine. Rear, an Eastern Arctic garment made of summer gut; front, an Alaskan garment made of winter gut (imarnin in the Yup'ik language of the Yup'ik and Cup'ik).

Traditionally, a tuilik can be made from specially-prepared seal-skin, sewn with sinew, with draw-string seals. A sealskin tuilik is soaked, stretched, rubbed, and greased to keep it soft and waterproof.

Garments to seal a person to a kayak coaming can also be made of gut. Gut tuiliks are made of the intestines of sea mammals or bears. The gut is turned inside-out to clean both sides, then inflated to dry. Inflated gut dries quickly. If it is dried in cold, dark, windy weather, it becomes opaque and white, and is known as "winter gut". "Summer gut" is yellowish and transparent, and stiffer. The gut is then slit open lengthwise and the strips are sewn into a garment. The smoother inside of the gut becomes the outside of the garment.

Modern tuiliks made from neoprene are called tuiliusaq (tuilik-like). Neoprene tuiliusaqs provide buoyancy and good insulation against the cold. This makes them feel quite unlike a sealskin tuilik.

Thinner materials feel more like the traditional sealskin. Some tuiliks have been made of cotton canvas. They are also made from waterproof, breathable laminate fabrics similar to those used for rain jackets. Some now use polyurethane laminate fabrics (including fleeces), which are less warm and buoyant than neoprene. However, PUL is somewhat stretchy, less bulky and more durable, and works better over a drysuit. Teflon laminate fabrics are also used.

Seams are avoided in areas where their bulk would make the tuilik stiff or cause water to pool, such as on top of the shoulders. One Greenlandic traditional cut has a front which wraps yoke-like over the shoulder, dropped sleeves, a seam along each sleeve in line with the thumb, two vertical side seams, and a hood seam around the front and side base of the neck (the hood is cut in one piece with the back). See lede illustration.

=== Seals ===
The tuilik must seal reasonably at the face and kayak cockpit coaming, and usually at the wrists. This is done using smooth, stretchy, grippy materials. Both laminate fabrics and neoprene will seal, but stretchier neoprene often seals better, so some non-neoprene tuiliks have neoprene rands. Stretchier neoprene with one smooth side may grip and seal better, so even neoprene tuilikusaqs may use a different neoprene for the seals.

Elastic cords (including leather thongs), and sometimes velcro straps, are used to keep the seals in place.

The hood edge must seal to the face, and usually has a draw-cord that wraps 1.3 times around the hood opening, with the cord doubled at the top and exiting the casing through holes near the ends of the wearer's eyebrows before tying adjustably behind the head. The entire hood may be made of stretchier materials for a closer fit.

Any cuffs must be at least fairly water-tight. Cuffs may therefore may be made of neoprene (like the hood edge) or dry-suit wrist seals (which can be made of silicone rubber, or latex rubber similar to that used in bicycle inner tubes).

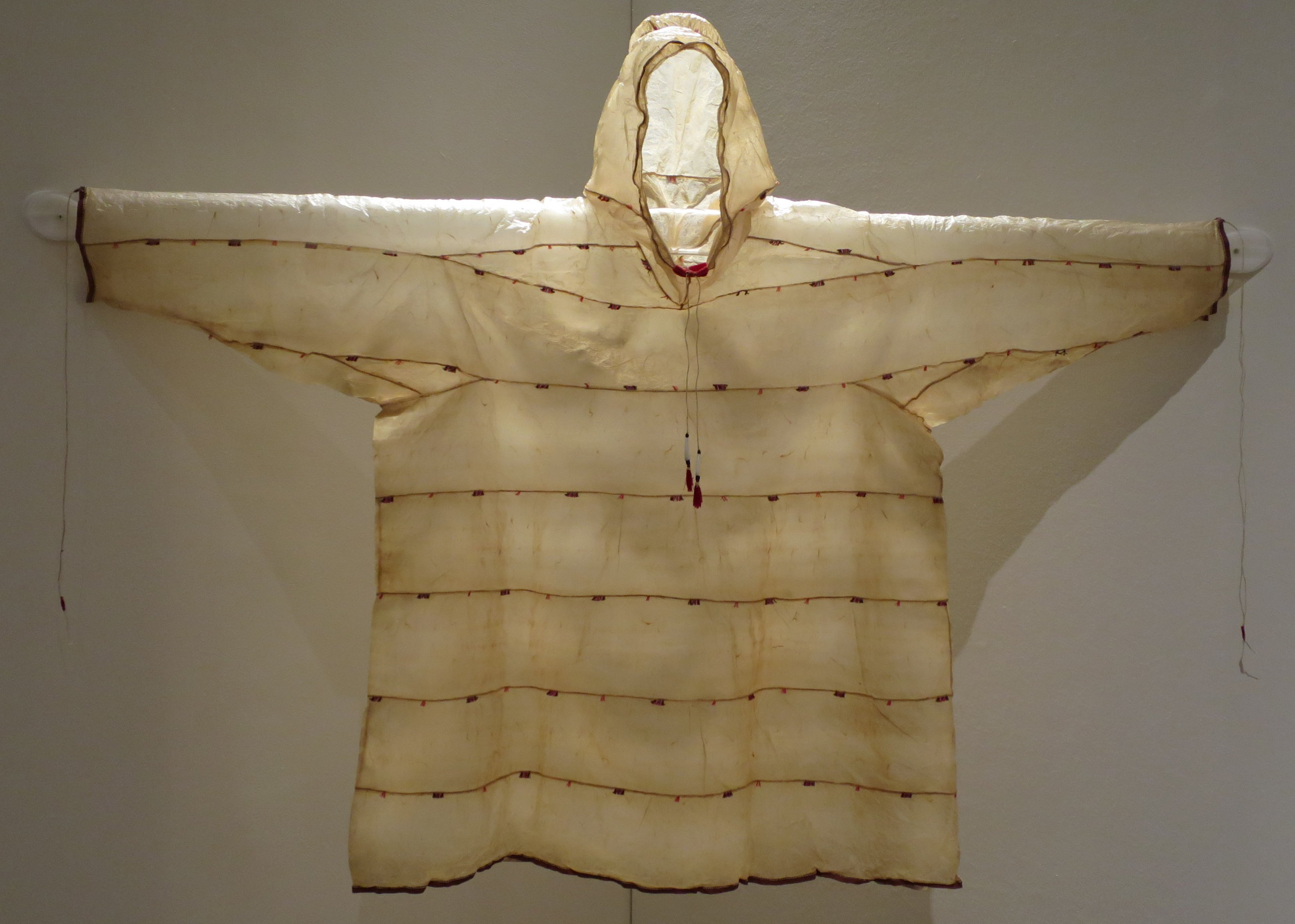
Stretchy drawstrings seal this gut tuilik at the cuffs, face, and kayak coaming

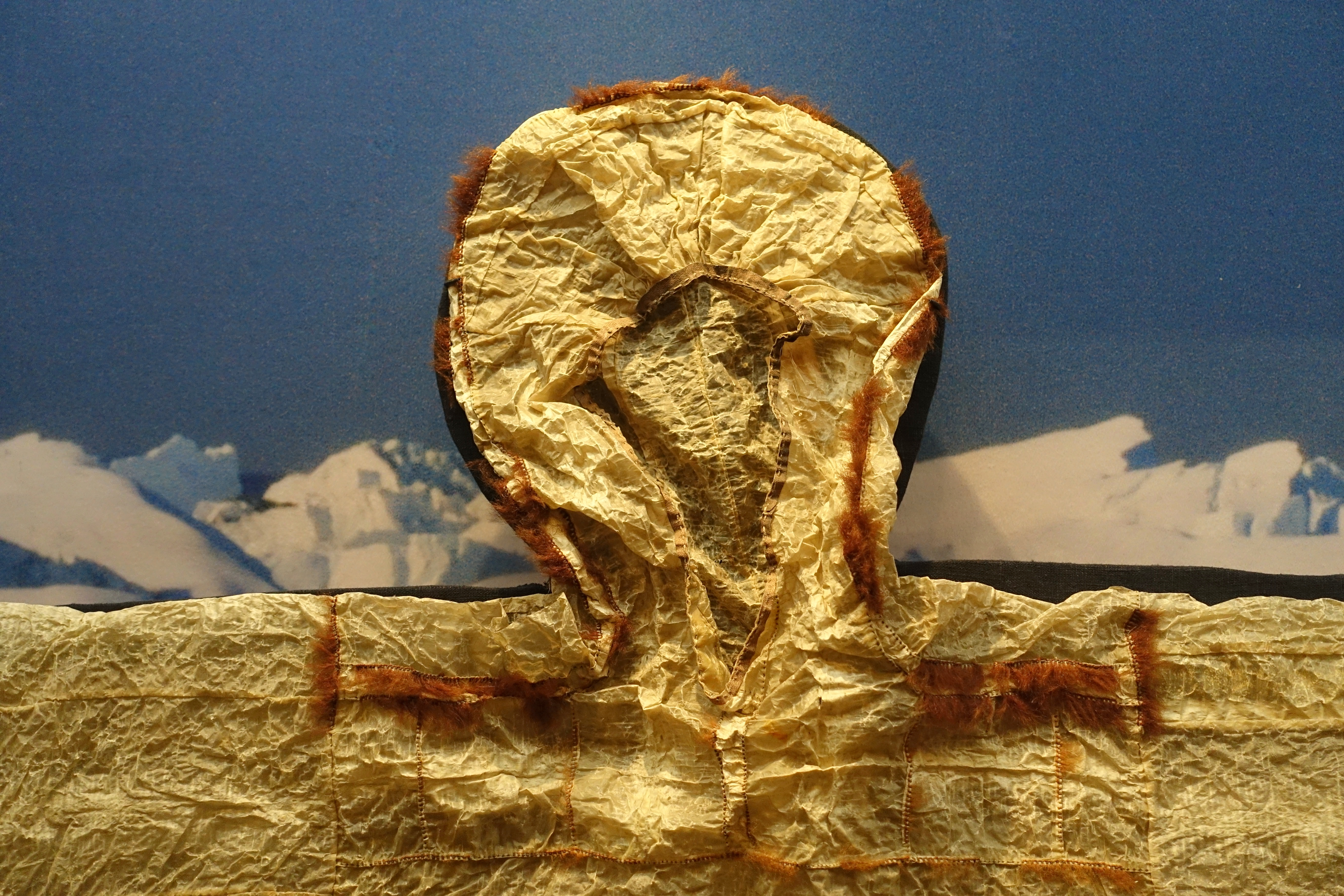
A closeup of a drawstring face seal. Fur is sewn into watertight seams.

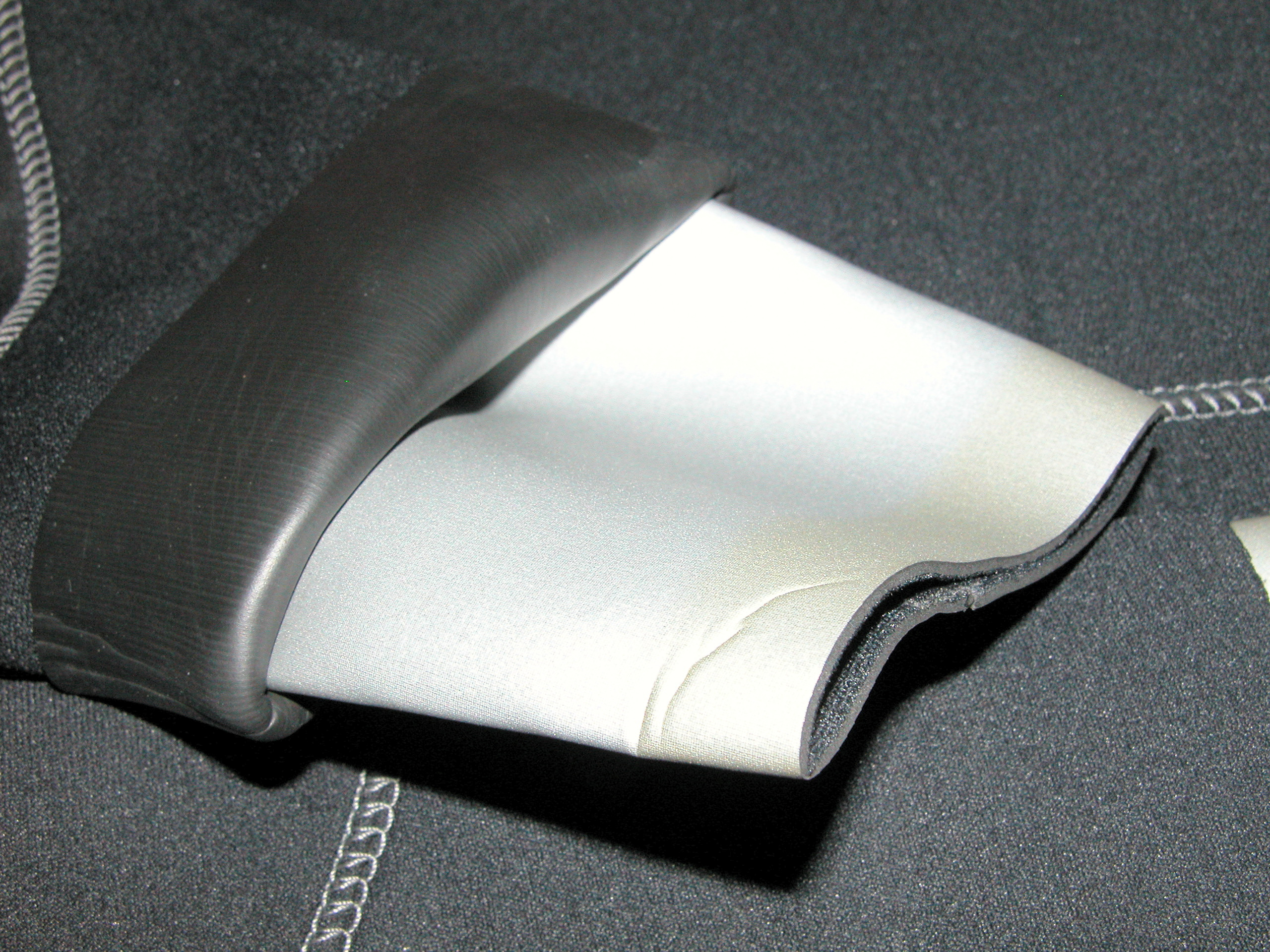
Neoprene cuff (of a wetsuit). Outer layer is single-sided neoprene; inner layer is double-sided.

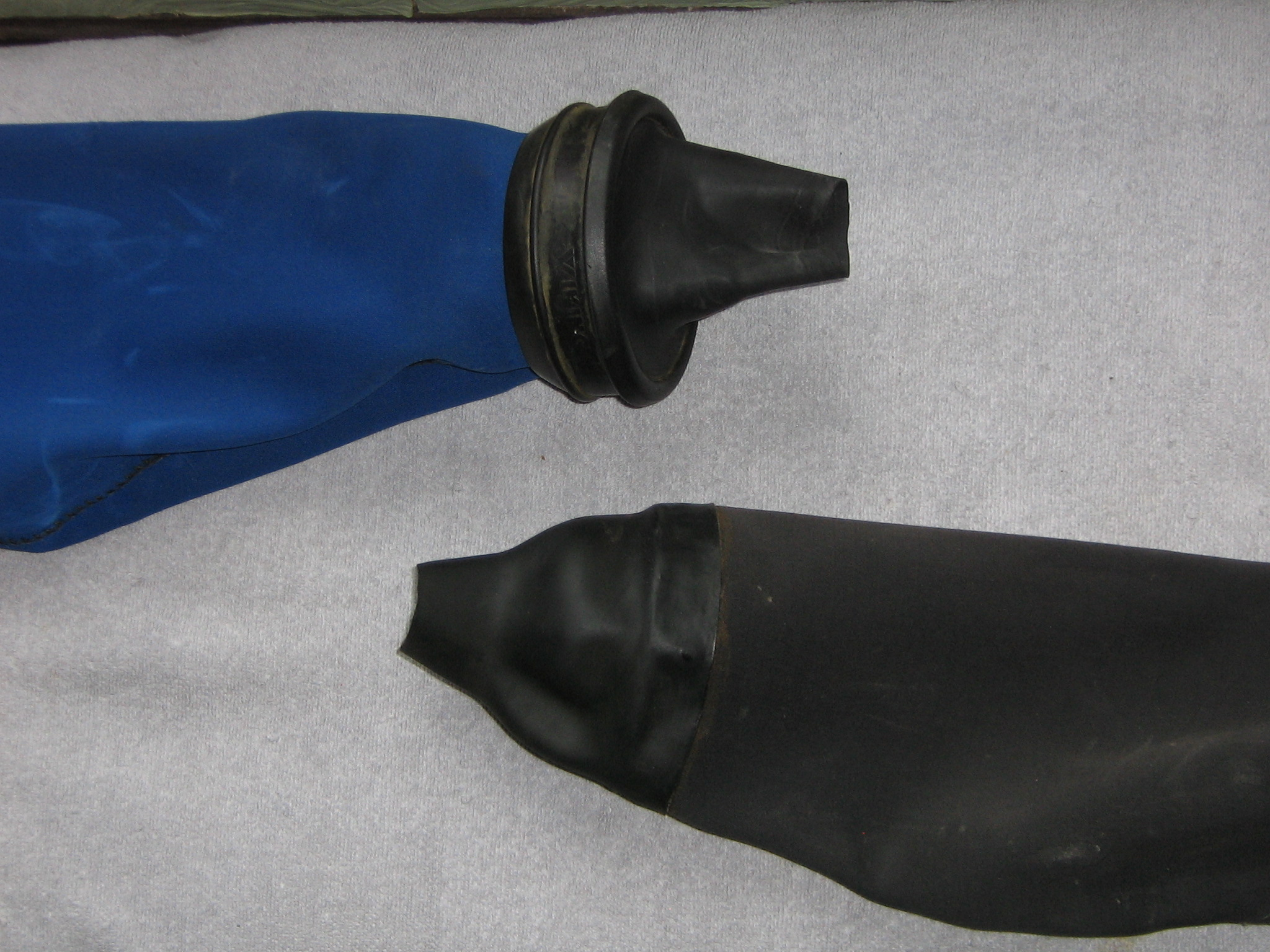
Latex cuff seals

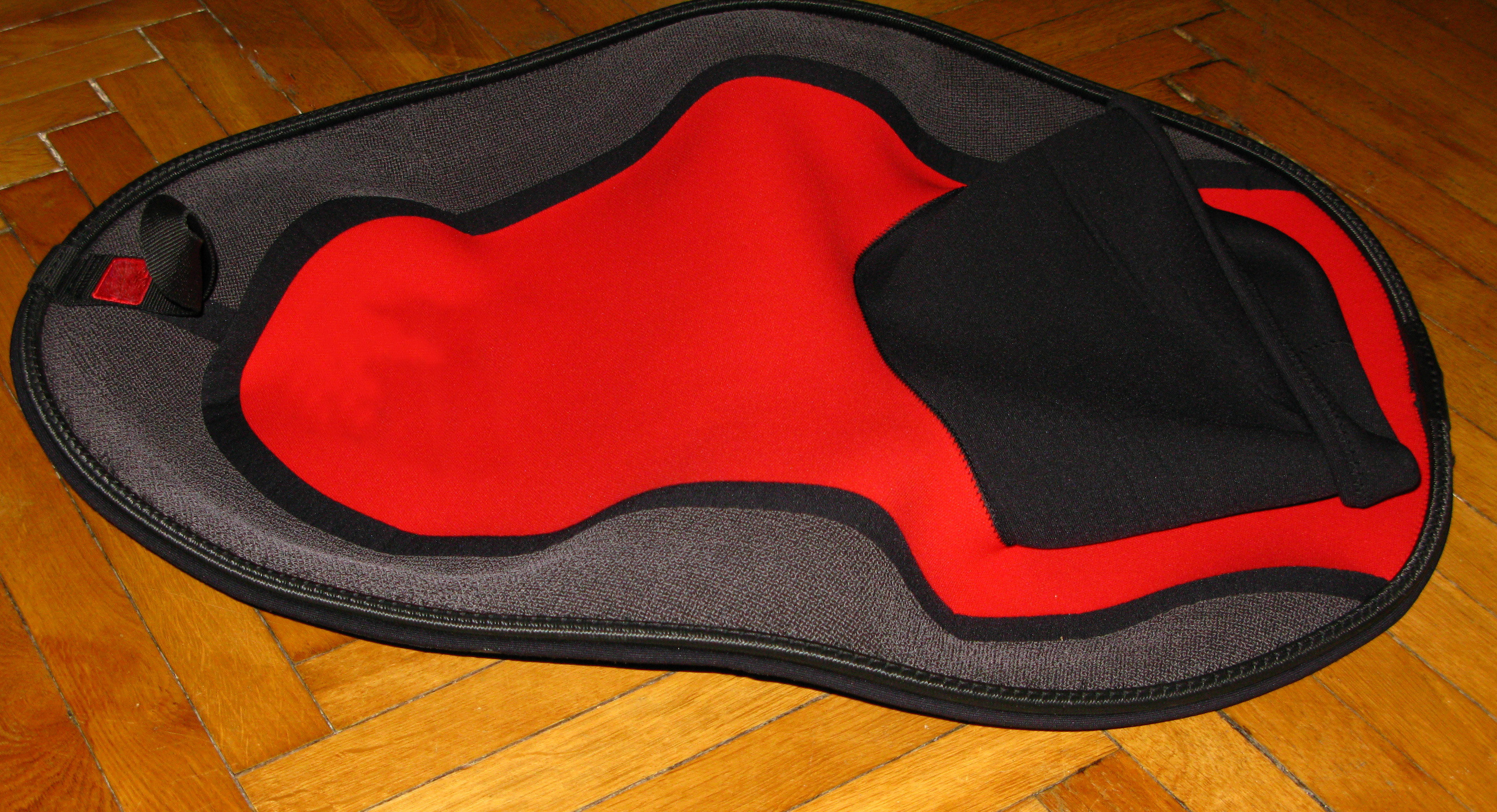
Spraydeck (an alternative to a tuilik) showing a cord sewn to the rand that seals to the kayak cockpit.

== See also ==
- Kamleika, the Russians called traditional Aleut gut garments kamleikas; this word has been borrowed into Yup'ik from the Russian as kamliikaq, and that word has been used generally for any gut garment.
