= Whitewater kayaking =

Type of water sport

Whitewater kayaking is an outdoor adventure sport where paddlers navigate a river in a specially designed kayak. Whitewater kayaking includes several styles: river running, creeking, slalom, playboating, and squirt boating. Each style offers a different way to experience the river environments. Various techniques help paddlers navigate rivers, such as paddle strokes (such as ready position, forward stroke, back stroke, low brace, high brace, forward sweep, back sweep, and duffek/bow rudder), rolling, and boofing. Whitewater kayaking requires much essential equipment to make a “kayaking kit,” such as a whitewater-specific kayak, spray skirt, paddle, helmet, and PFD (personal flotation device).

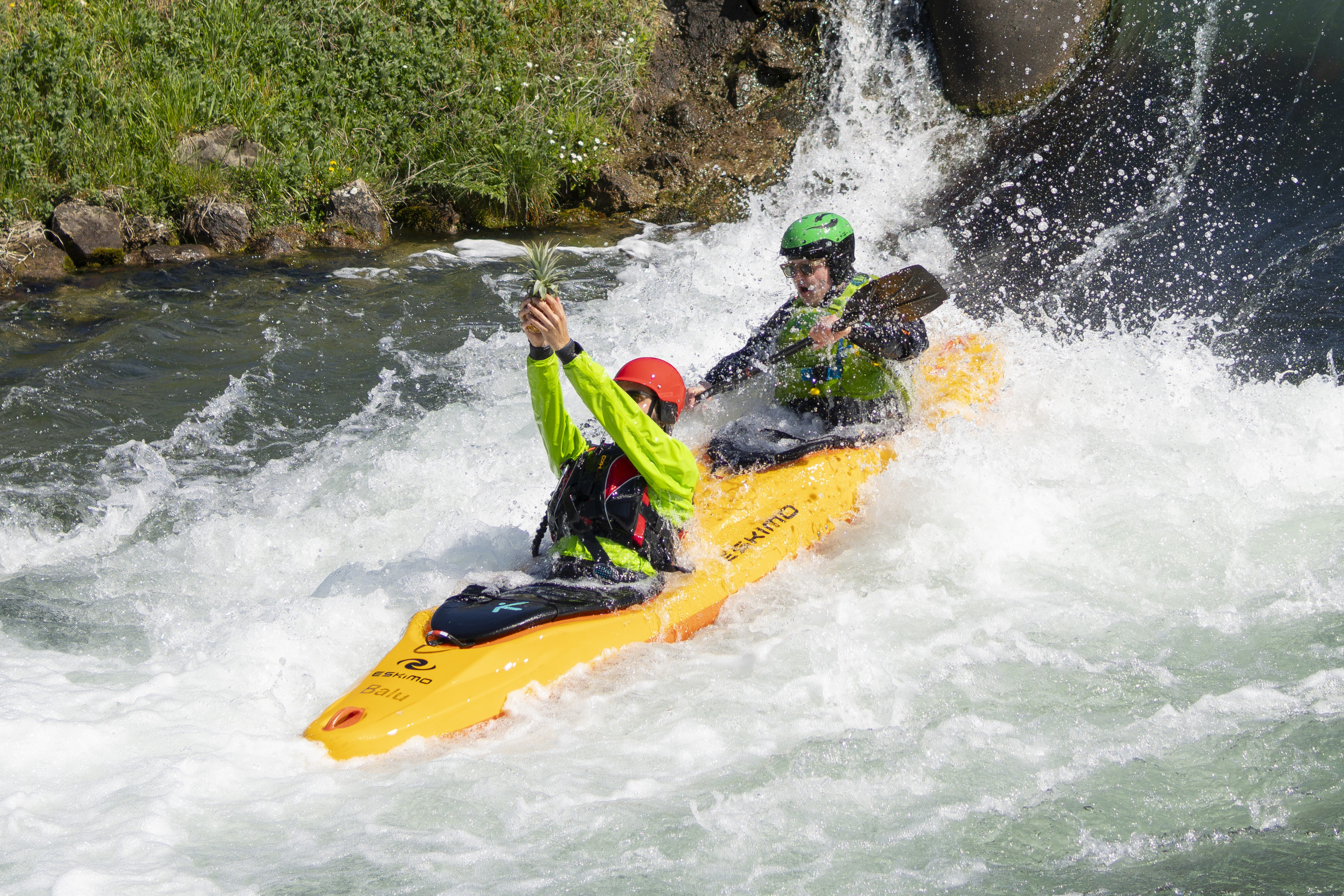
Tandem whitewater kayak going down a rapid

Paddling on rivers, lakes, and oceans dates back to the Stone Age, with rafts, catamarans, canoes, and kayaks evolving based on the needs of indigenous peoples. After his North American travels, John MacGregor popularized kayaking in Europe in the 19th century, leading to increased leisure paddling during the Industrial Revolution. Innovations by figures like Tom Johnson and Bill Masters further advanced the sport, leading to today's diverse and safety-conscious whitewater kayaking community.

Whitewater kayaking through "Mini Gorge" on the Whitewater River, North Carolina, USA.

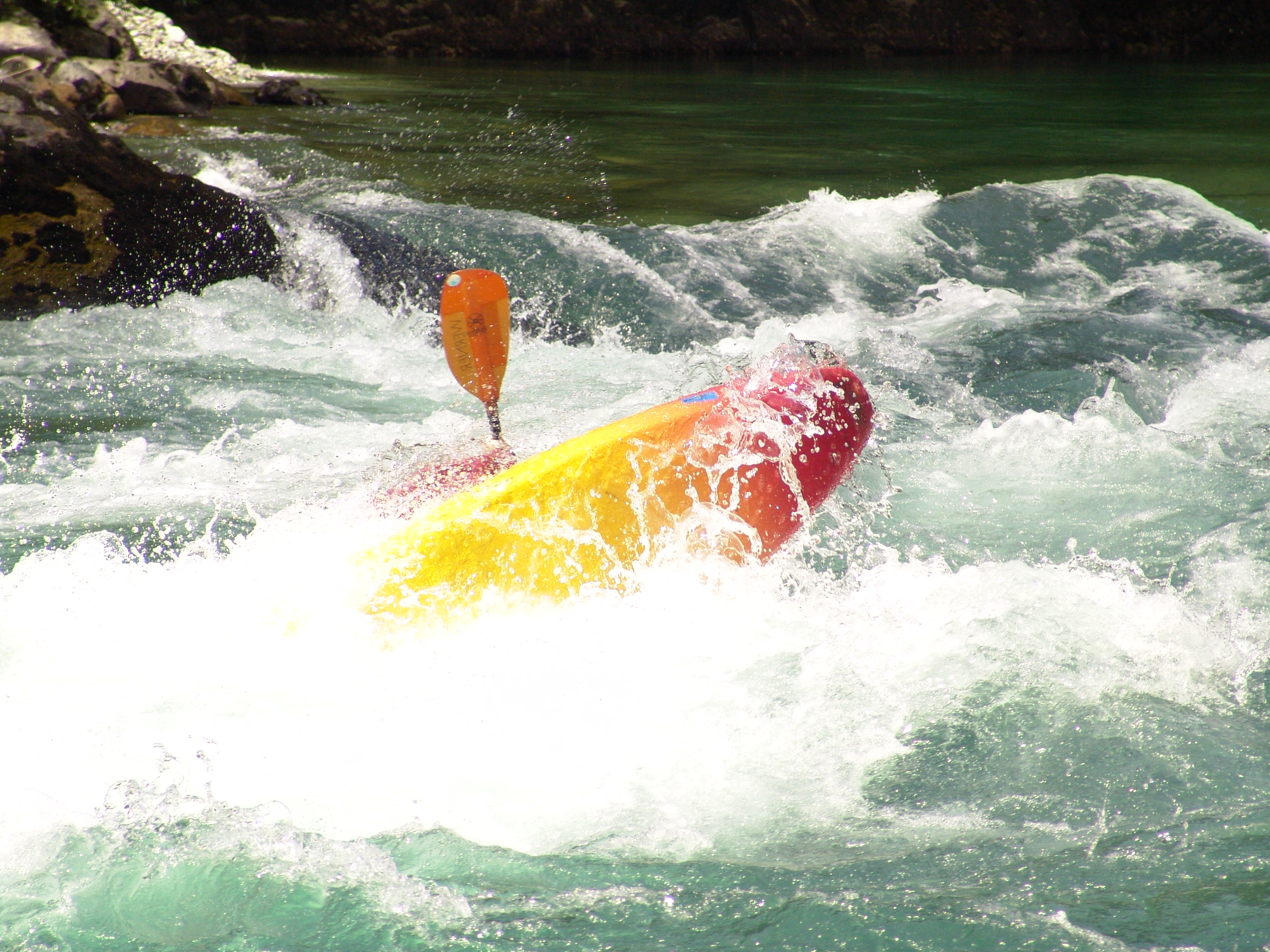
Kayaking around San Carlos de Bariloche, Argentina

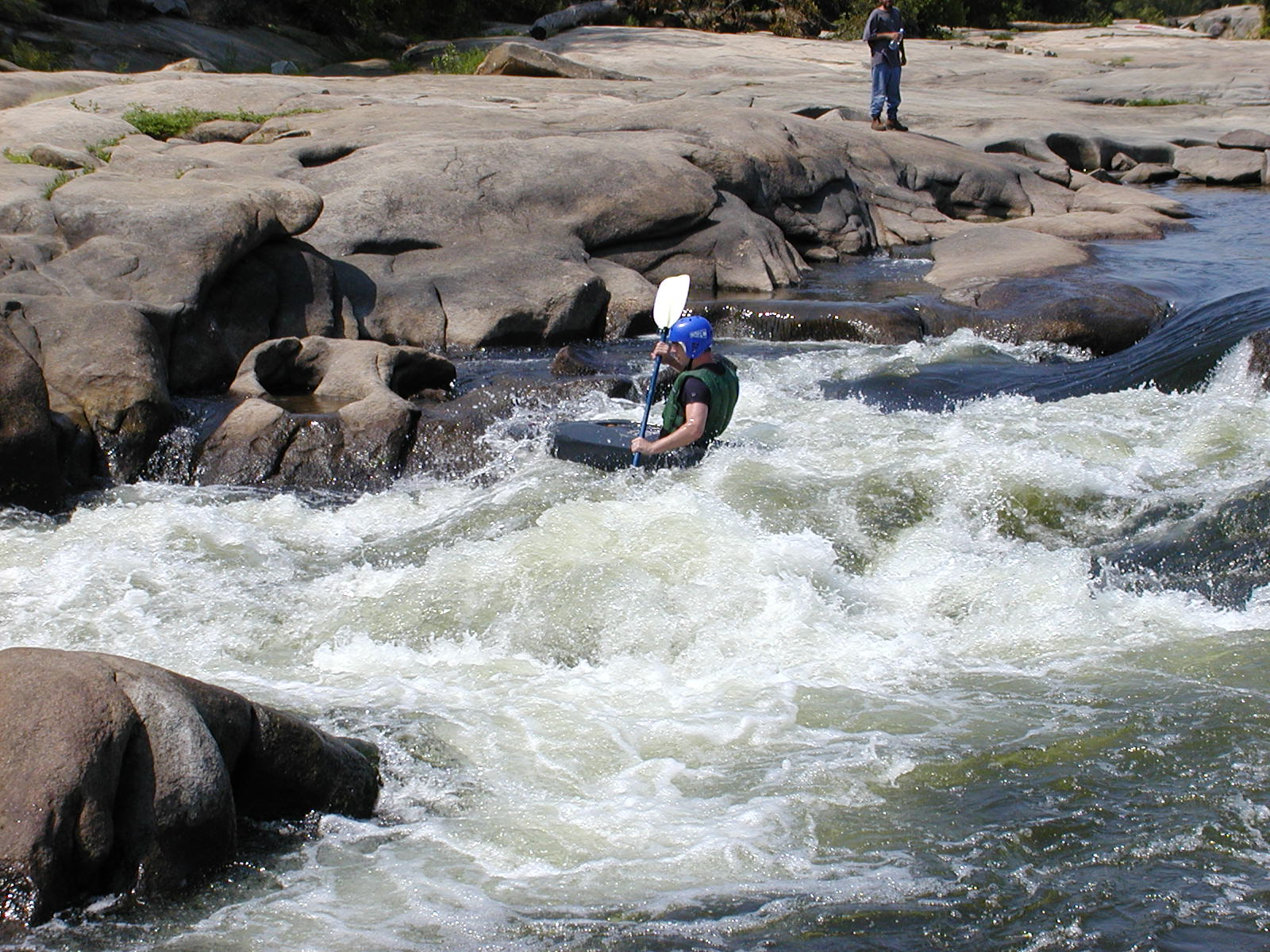
A whitewater kayaker running a class II+ rapid on the James River in Richmond, Virginia

== History ==
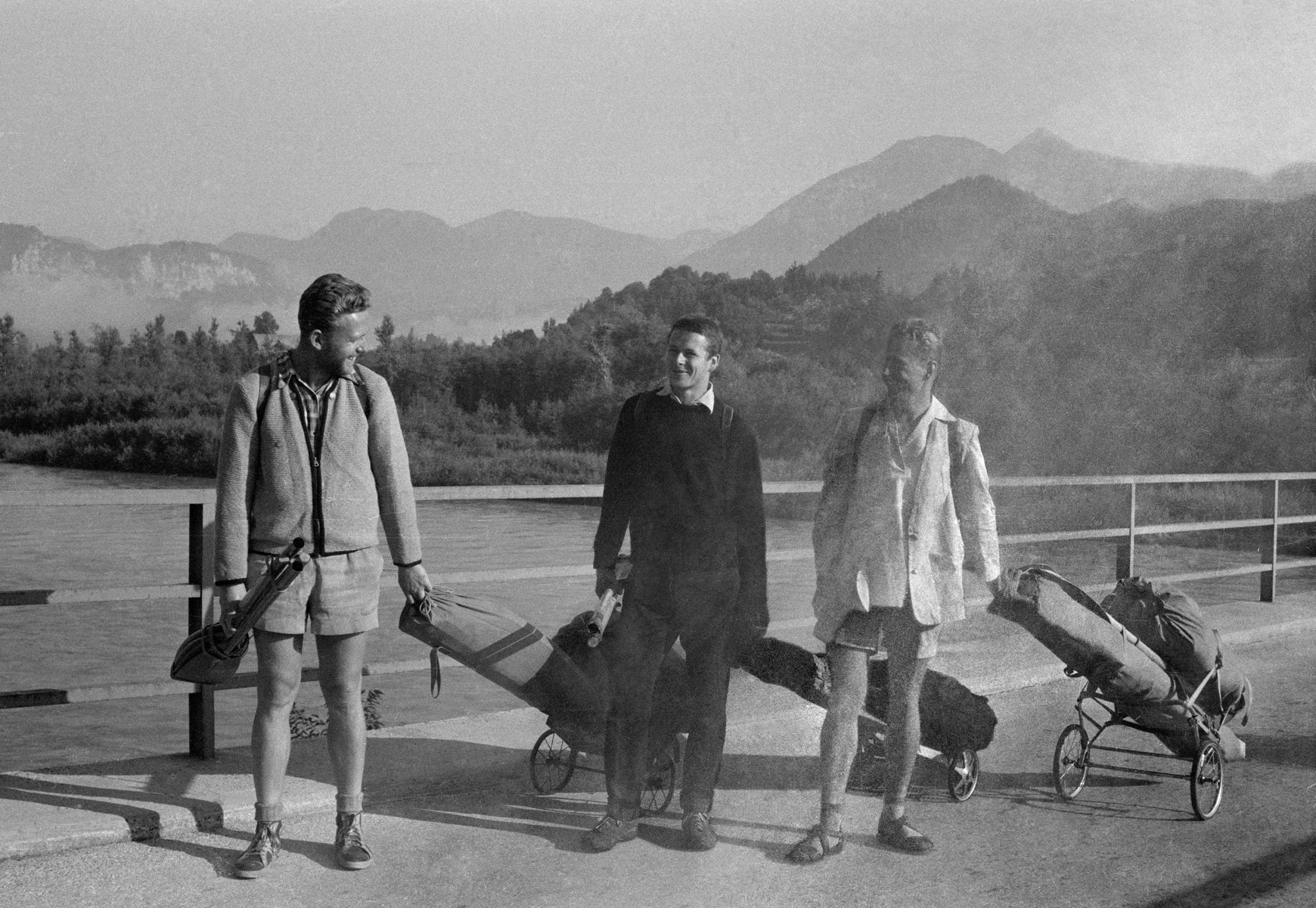
Paddlers with boat, gear, clothes and food.

Paddling on rivers, lakes and oceans is as old as the Stone Age. The raft, the catamaran, the canoe and the kayak evolved depending on the needs and environment of the indigenous peoples in different parts of the world. The modern day kayak most likely originated about 8,000 years ago along the Siberian coast line by the Yupik and then transformed from the open canoe, via the Aleut and Inuit, into an enclosed kayak. The first boats made were hard to sink because they contained inflated seal bladders, which made them ideal for navigating whitewater.

The Greek, Herodotus, 484-425 BC, wrote in his travel diaries about boats with which merchandise was brought from Armenia to Babylon. The boats were made of a wooden framework that was covered with animal skins. Mules hauled the precious skins back to Armenia.

The Russian, Grigori Ivanovitch Langsdorff, reported from his trip around the world (1803–07) on the ease and elegance of paddling Eskimo (Inuit) kayaks/canoes. The Scot, John MacGregor, came back from his North American trip full of excitement about the kayak/canoe and in 1860 started building six boats that closely resembled Inuit canoes/kayaks, weighing approximately 36 kg (80 lb). In 1866 he published the book A Thousand Miles in the Rob Roy Canoe. With the Industrial Revolution leading to more leisure time in the middle of the 19th century, people in Europe started to enjoy floating down rivers in various contraptions taking in nature previously only available to a selected few.

1905, Alfred Heurich, an architectural student from Leipzig, Germany, invented the "Faltboot", a folding kayak called Folboat in the US. Heurich went on to paddle over 100,000 km (62,000 mi) on rivers and lakes.

1907, Alfred Klepper, a master seamster from Rosenheim, bought the patent, improved the rigidity with a lever system and started production. Born was the Western culture's invention of a paddle craft that for the first time in human history that allowed hardy enthusiasts to see wild river sections and canyons never before seen by the human eye. The design not only made it suitable for whitewater (WW); it was also easy to travel with and was affordable. World War I stopped any progress.

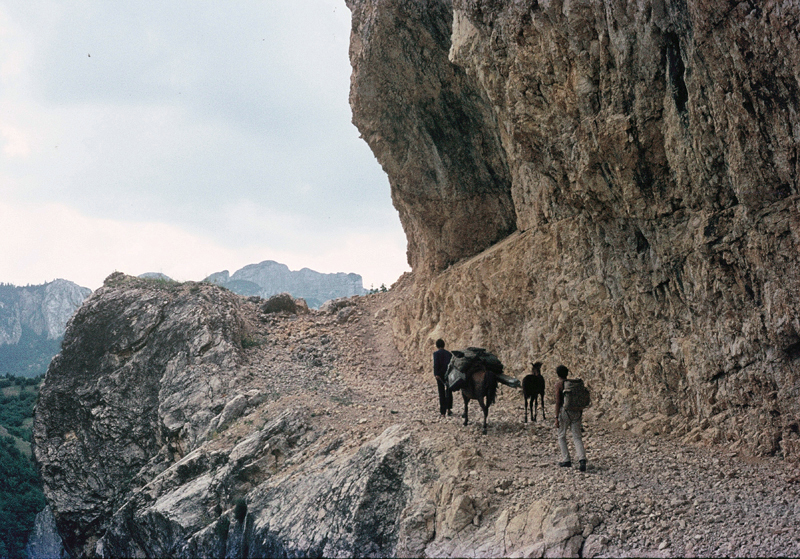
On the way to the put-in with 2 Folboats by mule.

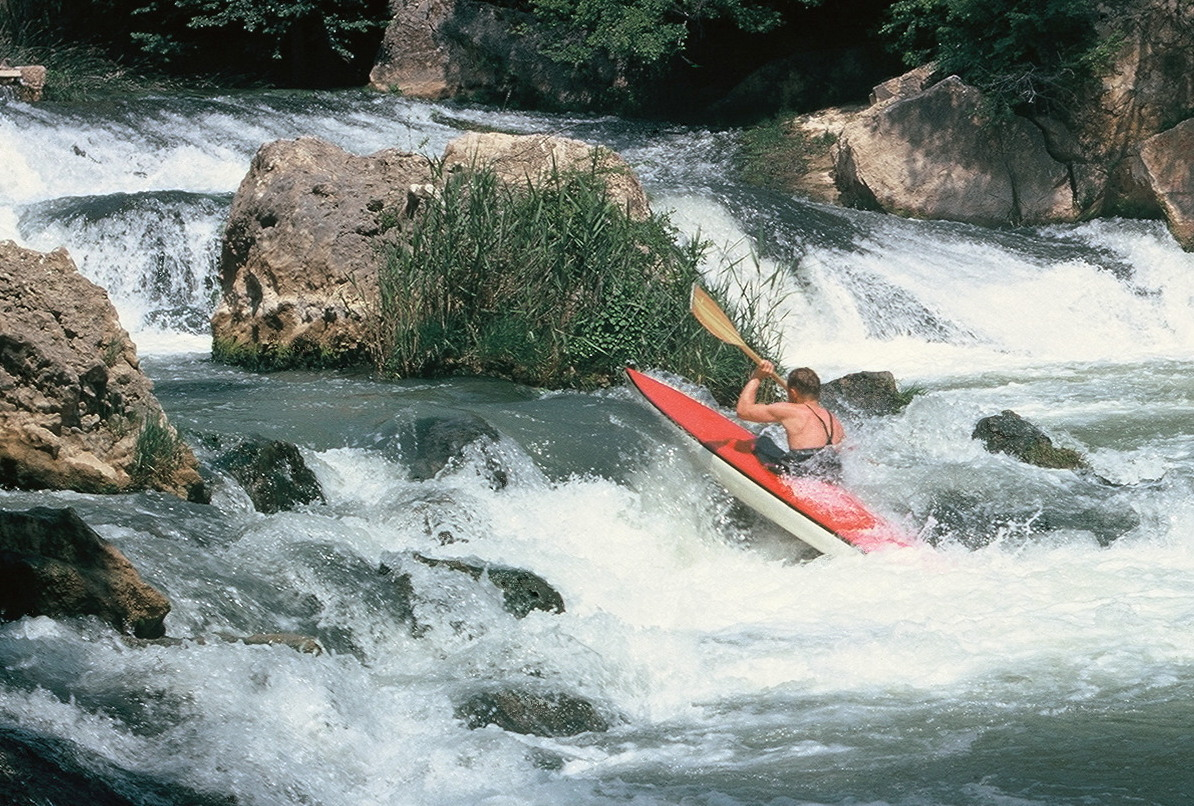
Kayaking before the mass-adoption of safety gear

1920s, boating on WW with Folboats developed. Boaters flocked to rivers and lakes by train or bus. During that time, the Austrian, Edi Hans Pawlata reinvented the Eskimo roll.

1927, Franz von Alber, and then Klaus and Arndt von Rautenfeld, claimed to have independently developed a roll with their sea kayaks.

In the early 1930s, Walter Frentz, Herbert Rittlinger and a handful of others became pioneers and advocates of WW kayaking with documentaries and books.

1933, Adolf Hitler started to dissolve kayak clubs. They did not serve his plan and the impact on the sport was devastating. World War II brought the paddle sport to a total halt.

1946–48, In some regions, the Allies gradually lifted the ban on river travel in Germany. Paddle clubs were again allowed to form.

1952, Walter Frentz, published an inspiring book titled In den Schluchten Europas (In the Canyons of Europe) that gained popularity. The book was based on his river trips prior to World War II. Publications in those days told detailed stories with pictures of first descents but with little information regarding river conditions. The tough times of the post-war era had come to an end and people started travelling abroad looking for adventures with Folboats and canoes.

1955, Herbert Baschin in Stuttgart built the first polyester/fiber kayak. Despite the much improved manoeuvrability and material, Baschin's hard shell was received with skepticism by paddle sport enthusiasts who were in love with their folboats and depended on public transportation. The ice broke when owning an automobile became affordable. The hard shell kayak was easily hauled to rivers and remote put-ins that were not accessible before. In the late 60s the WW sport started to spread from Europe around the world and transformed from adventure trips into a hardcore sport. With it came safety consciousness and protective gear.

1973, Tom Johnson, a racer and trainer from Kernville, California designs and markets the Hollowform: the first roto-moulded polyethylene boat. It was mass-produced by a garbage can manufacturing company. These virtually indestructible boats revolutionized the sport and quickly took off in California. Paddlers no longer had to constantly repair their boats during and after trips. They began to be able to use rocks as part of the strategy of negotiating difficult rapids. Hard runs became more accessible to less-skilled paddlers.

In 1978, Bill Masters, a kayaker and inventor in Liberty, South Carolina further perfected rotational moulding for kayaks with his company Perception Kayaks. Bill advanced the sport of whitewater kayaking beyond any of his predecessors through consistent innovations in manufacturing and design. His patented processes are still used to this day.

In 1980 the manufacturer Prijon in Rosenheim introduced polyethylene to Europe which made WW boating virtually maintenance and repair free in giant contrast to the Faltboot which had started it all.

1980 Holger Machatschek, together with ESKIMO kayak company in Landsberg, Germany, developed the first 2.2 m (7.2 ft) playboat called Topolino. The shorter, more maneuverable boat helped expand kayaking into new the new style that became known as playboating.

== Types ==
There are five "sub-categories" in whitewater kayaking, each typically utilizes a unique kayak design:

=== River running ===
Riverrunning (practitioners use one word) is the essential form of kayaking. Whereas its derivative forms (described below under the headings of Creeking, Slalom, Playboating and Squirt boating) have evolved in response to the challenges posed by riverrunning, such as pushing the levels of difficulty and/or competing, riverrunning, of its own right, is more about combining one's paddling abilities and navigational skills with the movements and environments of rivers themselves. Important to a riverrunner is the experience and expression of the river in its continuity rather than a penchant for its punctuated "vertical" features (e.g. standing waves, play-holes and waterfalls). As for kayak design, a "pure" riverrunning boat can be said to have "driving ability" - a blend of qualities that enables the paddler to make the most of the differential forces in the river's currents. For example, instead of spinning or pivoting the boat to change its direction, a riverrunner will drive the boat in such a way as to make use of the river's surface features (e.g. waves, holes and eddylines) thus conserving the boat's speed and momentum (this is in particular contrast to slalom racing, where, in the attempt to negotiate certain kinds of slalom gates, the boater will pivot the boat to change its direction, and by so doing, diminish the boat's speed and momentum.) A principal design characteristic of riverrunning kayaks (as well as for their closest cousin the slalom boat) is their comparatively longer length and narrower breadth (generally minimum 285 cm in length and maximum 63 cm in breadth). The longer length at the waterline not only helps to carry speed but the longer arcs thus created between stem and stern allow the boater to more efficiently and gracefully carve into, through and out of eddies and other currents.

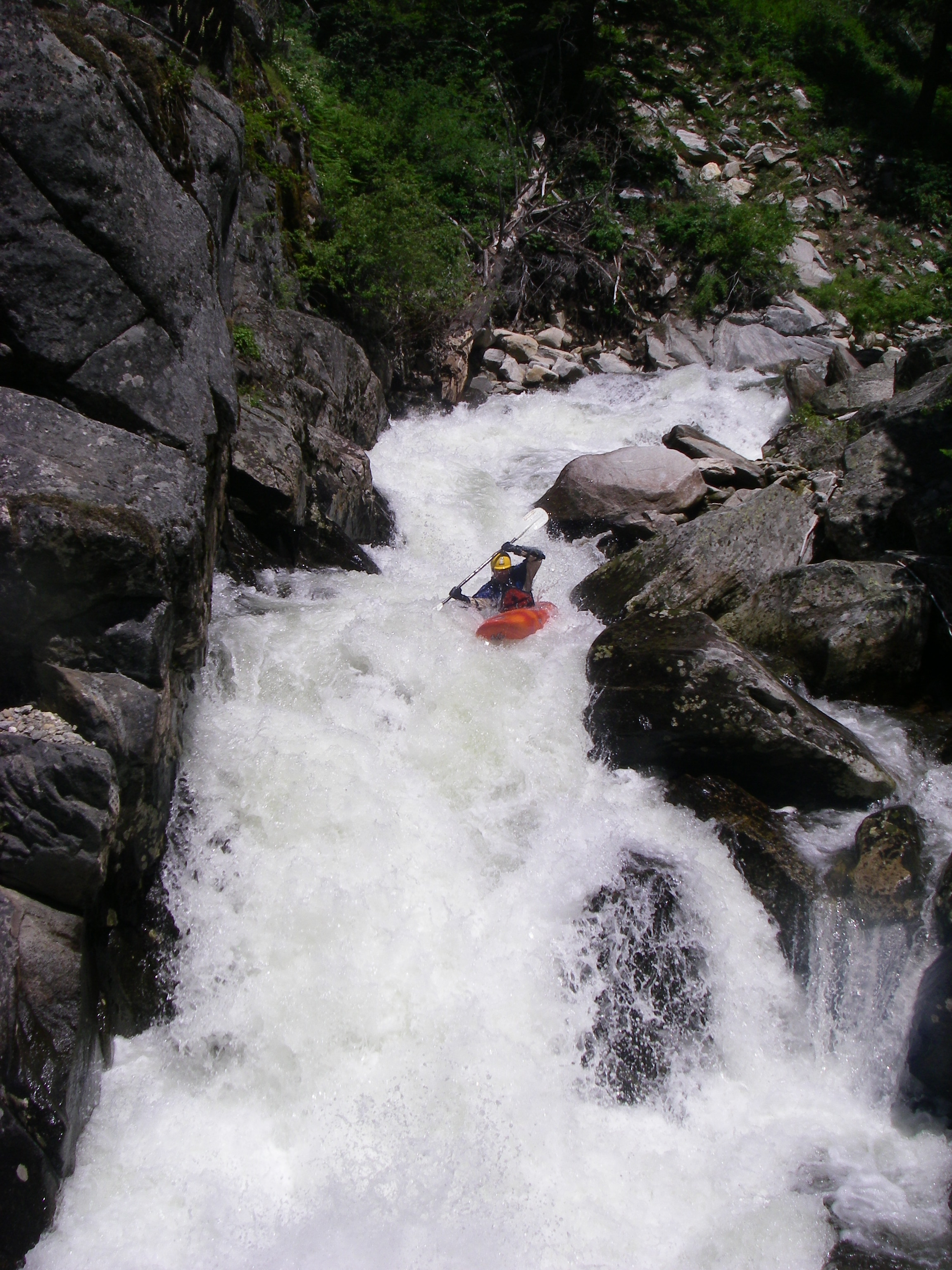
On Hazard Creek in Idaho.

=== Creeking ===
Creeking is perhaps best thought of as a subcategory of river running, involving very technical and difficult rapids, typically in the Grade/Class IV to VI range. While people will differ on the definition, creeking generally involves higher gradient (approaching or in excess of 100 ft per mi (19 m per km)), and is likely to include running ledges, slides, and waterfalls on relatively small and tight rivers, though some will allow for very large and big volume rivers in their definition. Kayaks used for creeking usually have higher volume (more gallons or litres of displacement) and more rounded bow and stern, as these features provide an extra margin of safety against the likelihood of pinning (getting a kayak wedged in such a way that it cannot be removed without a mechanical advantage system, such as between rocks and/or underwater), and will resurface more quickly and controllably when coming off larger drops. Creek boats usually have increased "rocker," or rise, fore and aft of the cockpit for manoeuvrability. Extreme racing is a competitive form of this aspect of whitewater kayaking, in which kayakers race down steep sections and/or generally dangerous sections of whitewater.

=== Slalom ===
Slalom is a technical competitive form of kayaking, and one of the whitewater events to appear in the Olympic Games. Racers attempt to make their way from the top to the bottom of a designated section of river as fast as possible, while correctly negotiating gates (a series of double-poles suspended vertically over the river). There are usually 18–25 gates in a race which must be navigated in sequential order. Green gates must be negotiated in a downstream direction, red gates in an upstream direction. The events are typically conducted on Grade/Class II to Grade/Class IV water, but the placement of the gates, and precision necessary to paddle them fast and "clean" (without touching a pole and adding 2 seconds to the total time), makes the moves much harder than the water's difficulty suggests. Pro level slalom competitions have specific length (350 cm (140 in) for kayaks – new rules), width, and weight requirements for the boats, which will be made out of kevlar/fibreglass/carbon fiber composites to be lightweight and have faster hull speed. Plastic whitewater kayaks can be used in citizen-level races.

=== Playboating ===
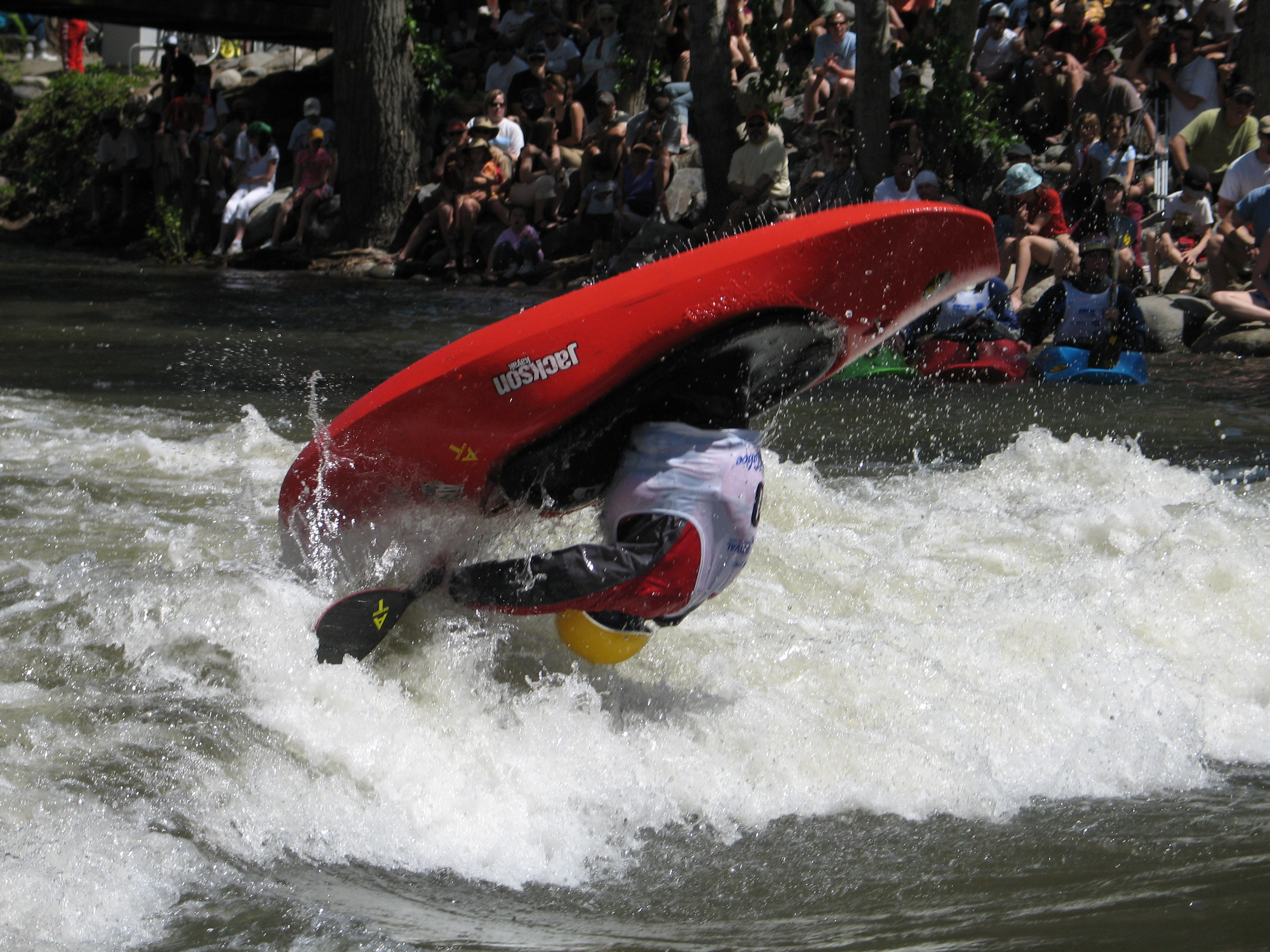
Playboater performing an aerial loop at the Reno whitewater festival.

Playboating, also known as Freestyle or Rodeo, is a more gymnastic and artistic kind of kayaking. While the other varieties of kayaking generally involve going from Point A to Point B, playboaters often stay in one spot in the river (usually in a hole, pourover or on a wave) where they work with and against the dynamic forces of the river to perform a variety of manoeuvres. These can include surfing, spinning, and various vertical moves (cartwheels, loops, blunts, pistol and donkey flips, and many others), spinning the boat on all possible axes of rotation. More recently, aerial moves have become accessible, where paddlers perform tricks having gained air from using the speed and bounce of the wave. Kayaks used for playboating generally have relatively low volume in the bow and stern, allowing the paddler to submerge the ends of the kayak with relative ease. Competitions for playboating or freestyle are sometimes called whitewater rodeo in the US, but more frequently just referred to as freestyle events in UK and Europe.

=== Squirt boating ===
Squirt boating incorporates the use of low-volume boats to perform special moves in whitewater features. Squirt boating predates, and was critical to the foundation of, playboating. Squirt boats are often fairly long and flat, with low volume throughout the design. Because squirt boats are custom built to the paddlers weight, inseam, and personal preference, they are constructed with composite materials instead of plastic. Many squirt moves are intended to submerge all or part of the craft and paddler, such as the "mystery move," in which both the boat and the paddler submerge completely into the river's flow for several seconds and up to half a minute.

== Techniques ==
=== Paddle strokes ===
A variety of different paddle strokes are used to guide, propel and turn the boat in various ways. Some strokes are used in combinations to perform manoeuvres such as the "S-turn".

==== Ready position ====
Kayaking, especially in whitewater is typically focused on having your paddle in the water. To properly hold a paddle, one makes a box with their arms and paddle, shaped with 90 degree angles at your elbows and wrists. The blades on the paddle need to be equidistant from each hand, and the power face of the blade, or scoop, should be facing your stern. This position ensures the hands are in the correct location on the shaft.

==== Forward stroke ====
The forward stroke is the most intuitive paddle stroke in kayaking although proper technique is important to master. To do a forward stroke the paddler holds his paddle vertically, with one hand close to the face, and the other hand outstretched outside of the knee. The paddle enters the water near the toes of the paddler, and the paddle is pushed out with the upper hand and pulled in with the lower hand, keeping the paddle vertical. To incorporate more than just the arms and upper back, paddlers should twist their torsos to reach and twist back while pulling to maximize their reach and power. The blade should leave the water by the paddlers' hips, and the low hand comes up to the face, with the face hand reaching out to outside the knee on its side in order to initiate the next stroke.

==== Back stroke ====
The back stroke is almost the forward stroke exactly backwards, although often it is shorter and the paddler may need to time "peeks" at his destination during the stroke to ensure tracking.

==== Low brace ====
This is an important stroke to learn as paddlers move from flat-water to whitewater, as it is a flip prevention stroke. The low brace is a manipulation of the ready position in kayaking. With the box commented on above, the paddler rotates their elbows up so the power face faces the sky. To brace the paddler takes "the box" and moves it out to the side they are falling over on. Keeping their elbows high they can slap the outstretched blade down on the water and push down and slide it back towards their boat as they redistribute their weight over of their boat, stopping themselves from flipping over.

==== High brace ====
If the paddler is already well on their way to flipping over they may use the high brace to right themselves. By dropping their elbows and reaching the necessary blade to the surface on the side they are flipping on the paddler can use the power face to pull down on while doing a side crunch to redistribute their weight over their boat. The High Brace is exactly the same technique as the C to C roll when the paddler is closer to being upside down.

==== Forward sweep ====
In order to turn the paddler needs to master the forward sweep. In paddling momentum is the paddlers best tool for successful advancement, and so ruddering or back sweeps as a way of turning, results in decreased momentum and a higher chance of getting flipped or caught in a hole or wave. To forward sweep right the paddler will need to bring their left blade to their toes like they would in a forward stroke although this time they will drop their right hand from their face, to their biceps, making the paddle more horizontal. They will then move their blade in a semi circle around their boat finishing at their stern.

==== Back sweep ====
The back sweep is the forward sweep in reverse, move the blade from the stern to the bow in a semi circle. Matching forward sweeps and back sweeps together is the fastest way to turn a boat if needed.

==== Duffek/Bow rudder ====
When paddling downstream paddlers can use some advanced paddle strokes along with differing currents to quickly turn their boat, one of these strokes is the duffek. In a river current generally moves downstream, but behind rocks or on shore the water may be still or actually move upstream. When a paddler moves from one of these currents to the other they can use the duffek stroke to quickly turn their boat into the direction of the current. A good visual representation of the duffek in real life is thinking about someone running down a sidewalk, grasping a pole on the sidewalk and swinging around it with legs outstretched to end up running in the other direction, momentum intact. In a kayak this can be achieved by putting a vertical paddle blade in the opposing current when crossing from one current to another. The hardest part of the duffek is keeping your paddle vertical right by your knee, and keeping the power face always facing exactly perpendicular with the current you are grabbing. In other words, the scoop of the blade always needs to be facing where the current is coming from. This is tricky because as you turn your blade will turn with you unless you twist your wrists to keep it static. If done correctly paddlers can enter and exit opposing currents with one duffek that can be turned into a powerful forward stroke upon completion.

=== Rolling and roll aftermath ===
Rolling is an essential skill in whitewater kayaking. This technique allows a flipped boater to regain an upright position. There are a variety of different styles of rolling, but in whitewater paddling the styles which offer protection of the face receive special emphasis. The roll is normally used instead of a T rescue (so named because two kayaks form a T shape when used). If the roll does not end with the kayaker upright they can set up again and make additional attempts. Multiple failed rolls usually result in the paddler running out of breath and "swimming" (a swim means exiting the boat completely and entering the water).

==== Handpaddling ====
Handpaddling refers to paddling without a conventional paddle. Instead, the kayaker uses plastic hand paddles. This technique is appropriate for paddlers that prefer to roll without a paddle (hand roll). Audrey Adamchak, age 14, thought to be the youngest woman to kayak the classic 225 miles whitewater stretch of the Colorado River in the Grand Canyon, accomplished this feat with hand paddles crafted by her father.

=== Boofing ===
Boofing, in whitewater kayaking, refers to the raising of the kayak's bow during freefall, while descending a ledge, ducking behind a boulder, or running a waterfall. This technique is used to avoid submerging the bow of the kayak by ensuring it lands flat when it hits the base of the waterfall. The term is an onomatopoeia which mimics the sound that is usually created when the hull of the kayak makes contact with water at the base of the waterfall.

Another type of boof is the "rock boof" which is a move that uses a glancing impact with a boulder at the top of a ledge to bounce the boater over a downstream feature, often finished with a mid-air eddy turn. Rock boofs result in sounds both at the top of the drop (boat impacting rock) and the bottom (boat bellyflopping into the water).

== Equipment ==
=== Kayaks ===
Whitewater kayaks are specialized boats designed for navigating rivers with fast currents, rapids, and obstacles. Unlike recreational kayaks, whitewater kayaks are shorter and more maneuverable, allowing paddlers to make quick turns and navigate tight spaces. They are typically made from durable materials such as high-density polyethylene or composite plastics to withstand impacts with rocks and other hazards. Whitewater kayaks come in various styles tailored to specific activities, including creek boats for steep descents, playboats for performing tricks in waves and holes, and river runners for a balance of speed and control. Their design features include a sealed cockpit to prevent water entry, adjustable outfitting for a secure fit, and rocker (upward curve at the ends) to improve agility and reduce the risk of capsizing. These features make whitewater kayaks essential for tackling turbulent river conditions safely and effectively.

==== Composition ====
Rotomolded plastic that can withstand repeated impacts and abrasion is most common. Most have the ability to be "welded" after significant damage. Earliest models were typically fiberglass and it was common to join a club to learn how to build your own. Today most composite kayaks are reserved for slalom or squirt boating.

==== Other features ====
- A large cockpit for easy exit in an emergency.
- A cockpit rim for attaching a spray skirt.
- Grab loops for extraction from a rock pin.
- Center pillars made of foam and provide support and prevent collapse from pressure.
- Thigh braces and hip pads maintain body contact with the kayak for more efficient paddling and easier rolling.
- Back band. More recreational kayaks have a back band that rises up above the cockpit for extra comfort. Whitewater kayak back bands are lower in order to accommodate a spray skirt.
- Rocker, a feature of the hull of the boat where both the bow and stern are curved upward, allowing the kayak to go up and over rocks more effectively, as well as allow for more maneuverability by reducing the length of the water line.

=== Paddles ===
Whitewater kayaking paddles are specifically designed to provide durability, control, and efficiency in challenging river conditions. These paddles typically feature a double-bladed design, with each blade offset at an angle (feathered) to reduce wind resistance during strokes. The blades are often made from strong, lightweight materials such as fiberglass, carbon fiber, or reinforced plastic to withstand impacts with rocks and debris. Whitewater paddles have a shorter and stiffer shaft compared to recreational paddles, allowing for precise maneuvering and quick response in turbulent waters. The blades are also larger and more curved to generate powerful strokes, making them ideal for navigating strong currents and rapids. Paddle shafts may be straight or bent to suit different paddling styles and provide comfort during extended use. These design elements make whitewater kayaking paddles an essential tool for maintaining control and propulsion in dynamic river environments.

==== Composition ====
Earlier paddles were often made of wood and then later with a heavy metal shaft and poly-synthetic blades. Advances in technology today include carbon fiber shafts with foam and carbon fiber blades on the high end, and low flex but light plastic on the low end, sometimes with rubber grips.

==== Shaft ====
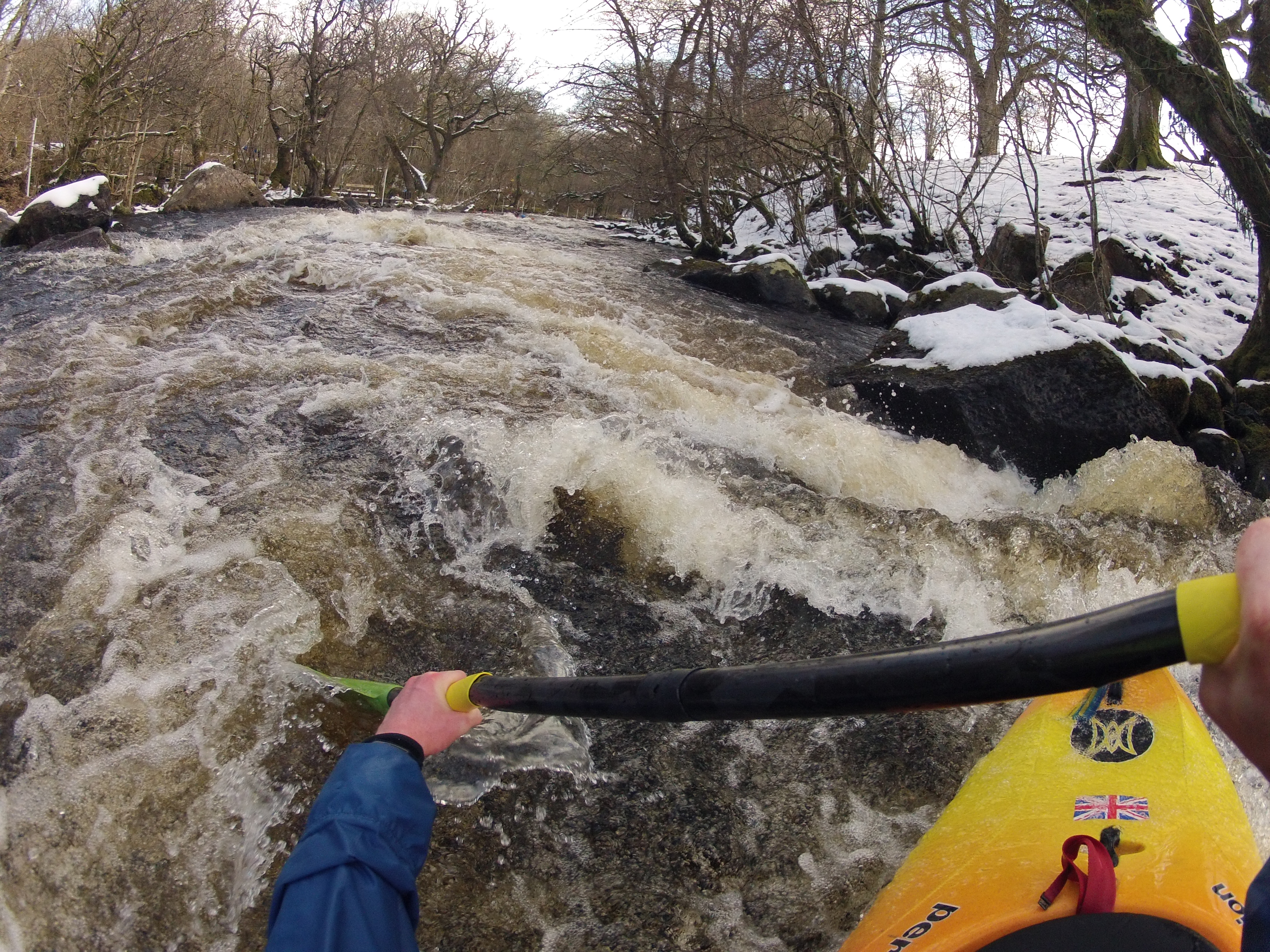
Bent shaft paddles seen here with yellow hand grips in use from a first person perspective.

Paddles with blades included historically measured over 200 cm, but now usually measure between 185 and 205 cm. Also the industry has begun to offer bent shafts that are ergonomically shaped to relieve stress off of the paddlers wrists. Many companies also offer specialized rubber grips to ease the paddlers grip and provide a place to feel where hands should hold the shaft. Small and regular shaft thicknesses may be available as well to offer smaller paddlers more comfort while gripping the paddle.

== Injuries ==
Kayaking and Rafting are considered an extreme sport. While considered not too extreme or difficult, on occasion it can be dangerous and cause serious injuries.

Kayaking and rafting exhibit distinct injury rates, with kayaking experiencing 3 to 6 injuries and rafting ranging from 0.26 to 2.1 per 100,000 boating days. In kayaking, acute injuries typically result from the force exerted by the water on the upper extremity, predominantly the shoulder, or collisions with objects during 'swimming' incidents. On the other hand, acute rafting injuries more commonly stem from contact with another rafter's paddle or equipment, followed by incidents where the rafter collides with an object while 'swimming.' Chronic injuries are relatively rare in rafting, contrasting with kayaking where they account for 25% to 40% of all injuries, primarily manifesting as shoulder or wrist complaints.

=== Other ===
In addition to the boat and paddle there are several other pieces of gear that are necessary for whitewater paddling. A buoyancy aid (BA) or personal flotation device (PFD), helmet, and spray deck (sometimes known as a sprayskirt) are considered essential while a throwbag, knife, and safety whistle are recommended as standard pieces of safety gear. Many people also wear a nose clip since flipping the boat and possibly rolling back up is a normal part of the whitewater experience. In addition the boater must be dressed appropriately for the water temperature, which might simply be a wetsuit or drysuit. The boat itself should be equipped with enough flotation to make pinning less likely and help enable its recovery.

== See also ==
- Canoeing at the Summer Olympics
- Freeboating
- List of whitewater rivers
- Rafting
- River surfing
- Riverboarding
- Whitewater canoeing
- Whitewater recreation in British Columbia
- U.S. intercollegiate canoe/kayak champions
