= Indian Kayaking and Canoeing Association =

Sports governing body in India

- Sport: Kayaking; Canoeing
- Jurisdiction: India
- Abbreviation: IKCA
- Founded: 1985
- Affiliation: International Canoe Federation
- Regional affiliation: Asian Canoe Confederation
- Headquarters: Lajpat Nagar, South East Delhi
- President: Prashant Kushwaha

Official website
- ikca.in
- (India)

The Indian Kayaking and Canoeing Association is the governing and controlling body of canoeing and kayaking in India. It was established in 1985 to bring awareness to the sport. IKCA is responsible for organizing and conducting various events including canoe sprint, canoe slalom, canoe polo, dragon boat racing, rafting, sea kayak and canoe marathon. Prashant Kushwaha is the current president of IKCA.
