= Kayak roll =

Method for righting a capsized kayak

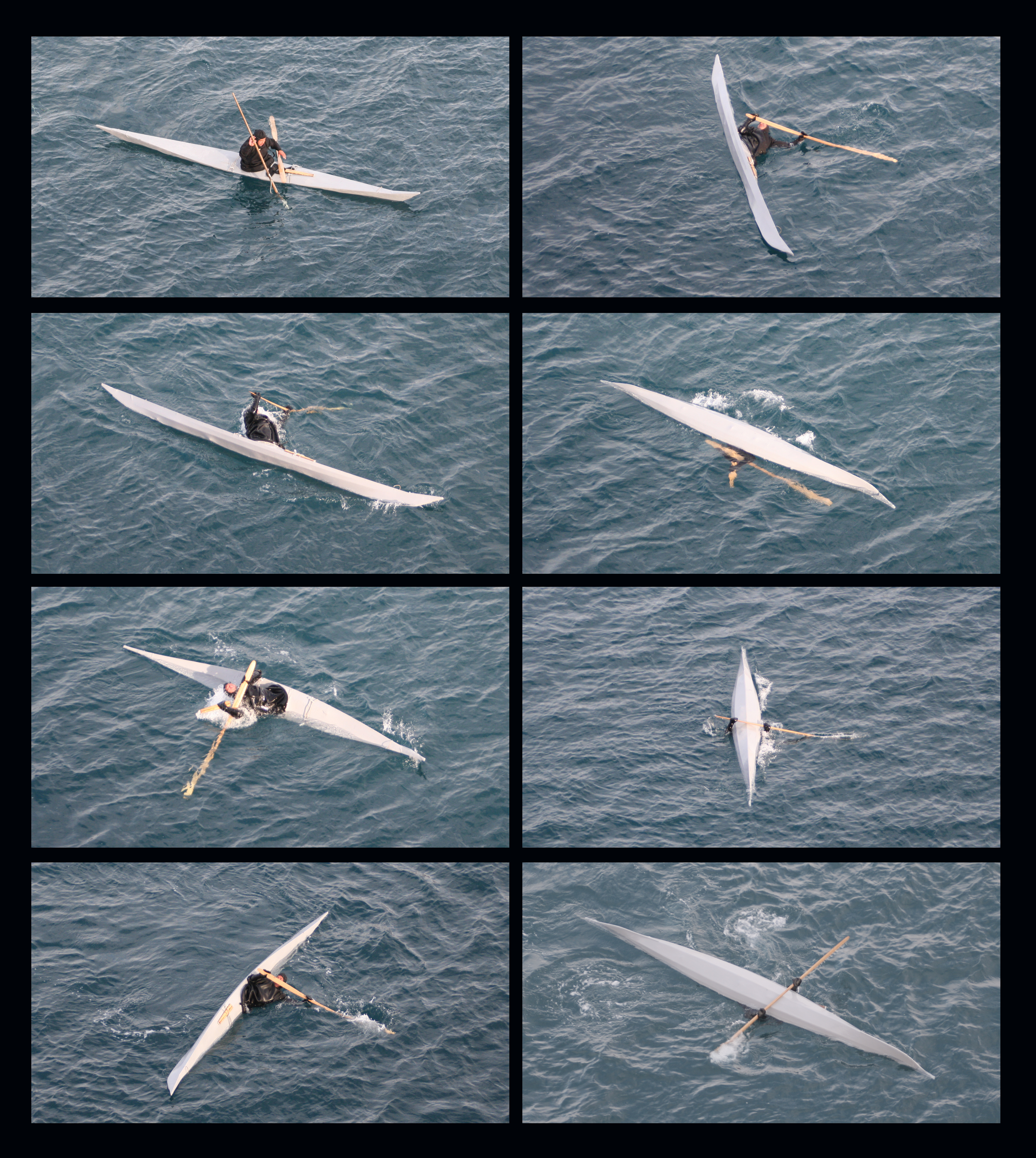
A demonstration of rolling as part of a traditional technique for hunting narwals.

A kayak roll is the act of righting a capsized kayak by use of body motion and/or a paddle. Typically this is done by lifting the torso towards the surface, rotating the hips to turn the kayak upwards and applying a small force by means of the paddle to assist the torso back over the boat.

A kayak roll was also known as an Eskimo roll.

The roll is an important technique for paddlers on serious whitewater, as exiting the boat and swimming leaves the swimmer more exposed than remaining in the boat.

== History ==
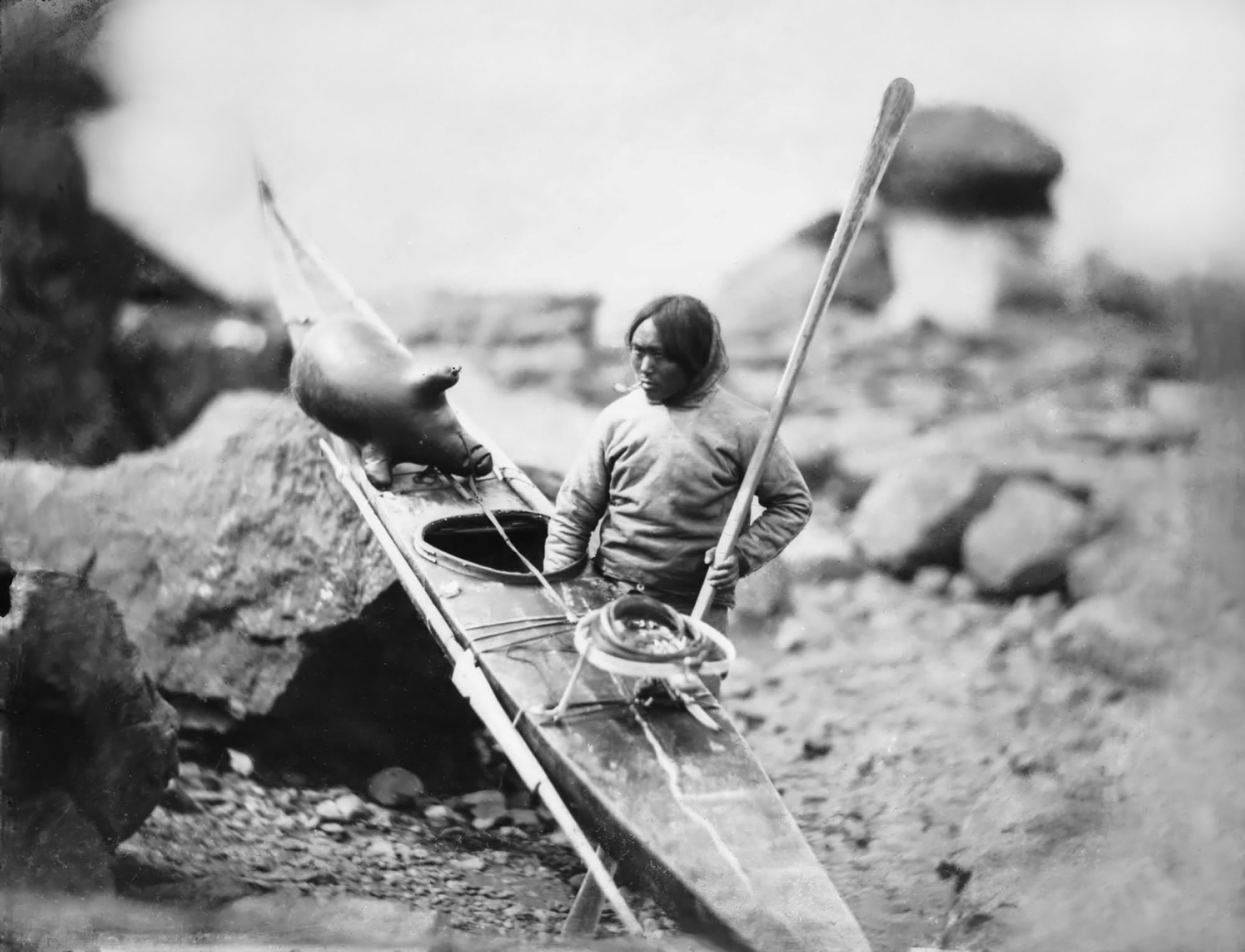
An Inuk hunter with his kayak in 1854

The skill of righting a capsized kayak was devised by the hunter-gatherer societies that also developed the kayak as a hunting boat, such as the Aleut and Inuit. The Greenlandic Inuit used several techniques that allowed the kayak to be righted with or without a paddle, also using only one hand, or without hands at all. A survey in Greenland in 1911 found that of a total of 2,228 hunters with a kayak of their own, 867 were able to roll.

In 1605, some Inuit men and their kayaks were brought back to Europe by a Danish expedition. They gave a demonstration, watched by King Christian IV, of rolling and of racing against rowing boats in Copenhagen harbour. A similar exhibition was held at The Hague in 1625. Paul Egede, the teenaged son of a missionary living with the Inuit, was probably the first non-native to learn to roll a kayak in the 1730s. Rolling was demonstrated in 1889 at Sandviken, Norway by Oluf Dietrichson, a member of Nansen's 1888 Greenland expedition. With the rapid growth in the sport of kayaking in Europe and the United States during the 1920s, the ability to roll was popularised by an Austrian kayaker, Edi Hans Pawlata (1900–1966). Although not, as he claimed, the first European to acquire the skill, he developed a technique with one hand gripping the end of the paddle, which proved easy to master. Greenlandic kalaaleq, Manasse Mathæussen (1915–1989), earned a living giving rolling demonstrations and kayak stunts for films. In 1949, he set a record by performing 10 successive rolls in 18 seconds.

== Types of rolls ==
A kayak-mounted video of a roll in a pool

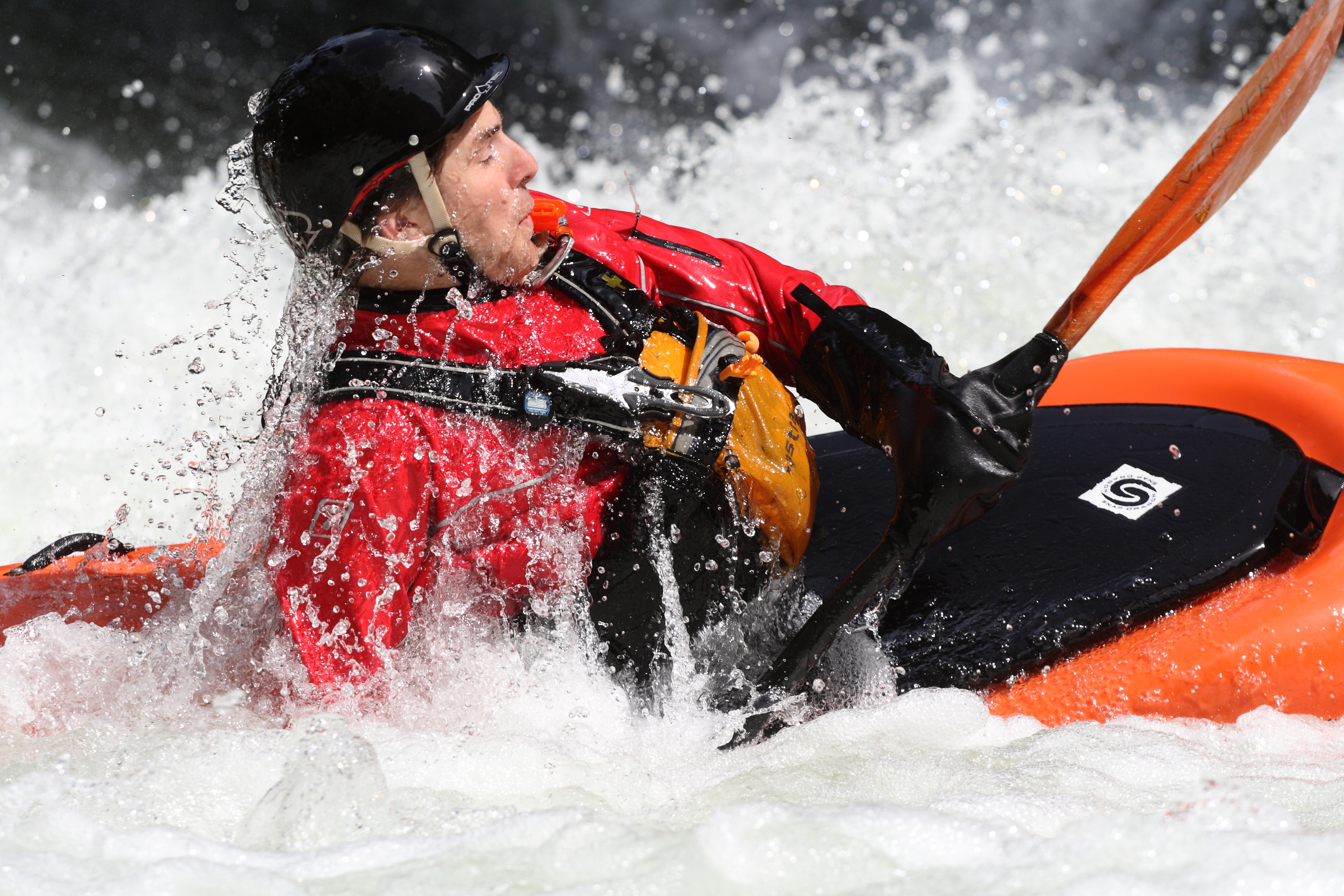
A kayaker surfaces at the end of a roll on whitewater

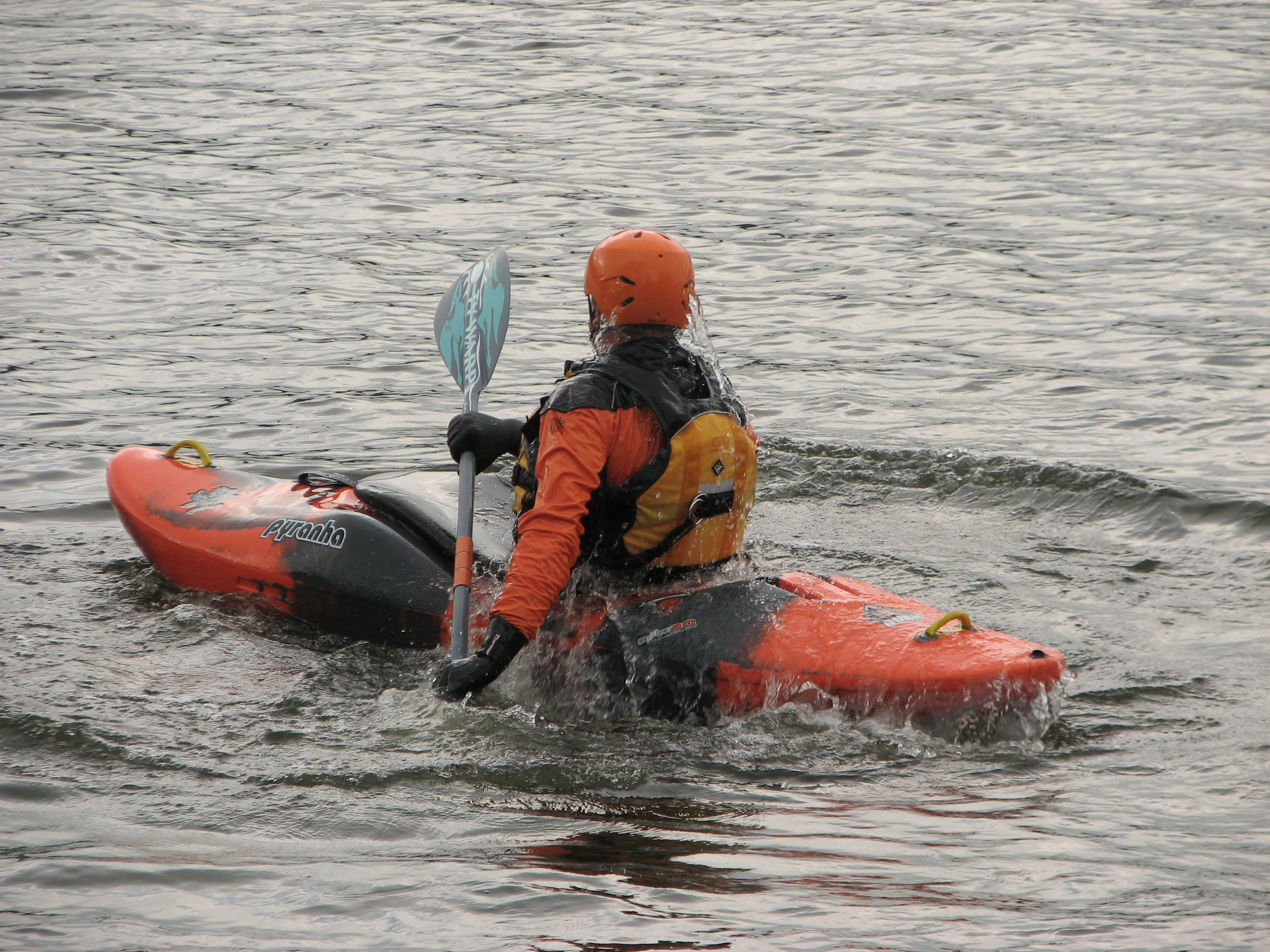
Kayaker coming up from a roll on flat water

A deliberate kayak roll

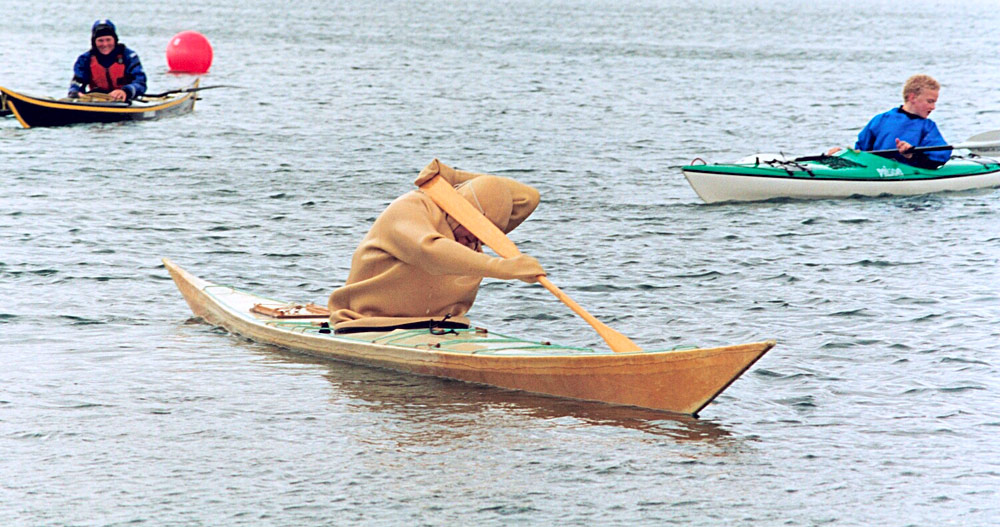
A kayaker in a tuiliusaq, in the starting position for a siukkut tunusummillugu roll

There are many types of roll, with variations on the common technique of combining a paddle stroke at the surface with a hip-flick. One key to all rolls is that the head comes out of the water last, following the paddler's torso—not first, which presents a non-hydrodynamic profile and tends to oppose the angular momentum which is the hallmark of a successful roll.

Thirty-five different types of roll and related maneuvers are performed at the Greenland Kayaking Championships. Different rolls have different purposes, such as righting the kayak if the arms are entangled or injured, if the paddle is lost, if the akuilisaq has come off or is not worn, or if the kayaker has to keep hold of something (in competition, an inflated avataq or an eight-kilogram weight),

=== Sweep roll ===
The Sweep Roll represents one of the earliest techniques employed in kayaking. In this maneuver, the paddler initiates an arc motion with the paddle, starting at the bow of the kayak. This technique facilitates the paddler's proximity to the water's surface, providing a tactical advantage in aerated water conditions. It aids in repositioning the paddler above the boat following a capsize.

A common end position for this technique places the paddler further back on the kayak, with the head lowered. The Sweep Roll is characterized by maintaining a flat paddle orientation throughout the roll and concludes with the paddler slightly leaning back. This roll technique has been widely and successfully imparted in both white water and sea kayaking practices since its early inception.

=== Screw roll ===
The Screw Roll is typically the initial maneuver taught to novices in the realm of kayaking, and is frequently referred to as "the roll". This roll is used in various water conditions, though its requirement for a reasonably spacious area for learning can limit its usefulness in confined spaces or whitewater scenarios.

Instruction for the Screw Roll emphasizes simultaneous rotation of the torso and the paddle shaft. This coordinated movement is designed to reduce resistance and position the kayaker in an optimal paddling stance. Over time, modifications to the original Sweep Roll have been introduced to further enhance its efficiency. One notable modification led to the development of the Screw Roll, a technique that involves a full upper body rotation, enabling the paddler to maintain an upright position throughout the manoeuvre.

Despite these technical differences, the terms "Sweep Roll" and "Screw Roll" are often used interchangeably in common parlance, blurring the distinctions between the original technique and its modern adaptations.

=== C-to-C roll ===
The C-to-C roll is another common roll that tends to be used more on whitewater. The name was inspired by the two curved shapes adopted by the body during the roll.

=== Reverse Screw roll (a.k.a. "Back Deck Roll") ===
As the name suggests this is similar to the screw roll but performed in reverse, it is often used in playboating or in general when the paddler goes over whilst on the back deck. In this scenario it is far quicker to perform this roll than to move the paddle into a set-up position for a more standard roll. The disadvantage of this roll is that it leaves the face exposed and poses some risk to the shoulder.

=== Hand roll ===
This roll is a bit of a 'party trick' but can also be useful if the paddler has lost their paddle and is also useful in the game of canoe polo. It relies heavily on the hip-flick. It is also frequently used by paddlers who run big waterfalls, as landing at high speed without a paddle is considered to pose less risk than landing with a paddle.

=== Tallit paarlatsillugit timaannarmik (body roll, no-hand roll) ===
Rolling up without a paddle, with the arms crossed against the chest throughout.

=== Older forms of roll ===
Some techniques are rarely used by modern paddlers. The Pawlata roll is performed while gripping the far end of one paddle blade and sweeping the other from front to back. The Steyr roll is a reverse Pawlata. In the put across roll, one paddle blade is gripped while the rest of the paddle extends out at right angles to the kayak; the paddler pulls down on the paddle to right the kayak without any sweeping action. The storm roll utilises a vertical rather than horizontal sweeping action.

=== Fong's Roll ===
Fong's Roll is a non-hip-flick kayak roll, which uses hands to rotate a capsized kayak, without any help from attaching devices. Fong's Roll just changes the source of rotational force (for righting the kayak) from the rolling knee (hip flick) to the hand pulling. The principle of "body follow through" remains unchanged.

== See also ==
- Eskimo rescue
