= Wet exit =

Kayaking technique

The wet exit is a simple technique for exiting from a capsized kayak while wearing a spray skirt. It involves reaching forward and pulling the spray skirt's grab loop to release the spray skirt, after which the kayaker can push themself out of the kayak.

== See also ==
- Kayak roll
