= Eskimo rescue =

Using a kayak to right another capsized kayak

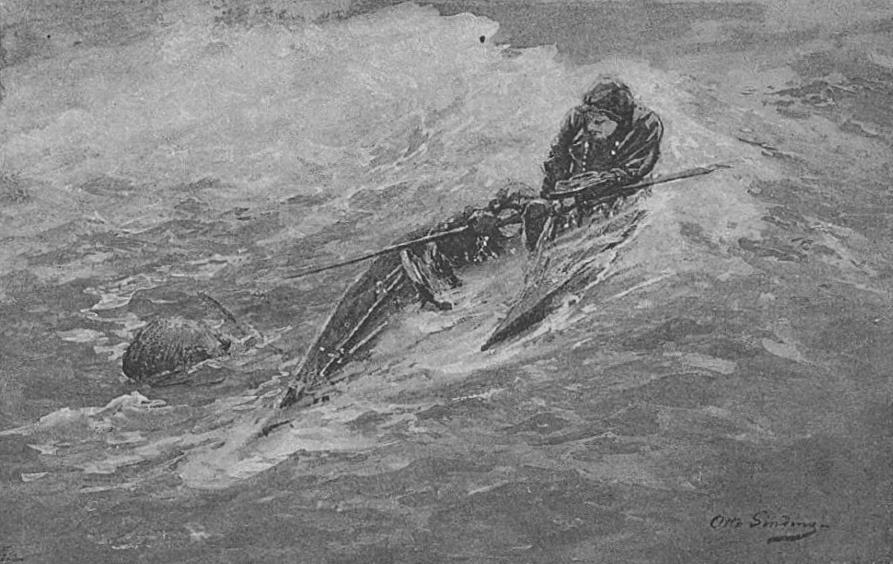
An 1800s illustration of a rescue.

An Eskimo rescue, bow rescue or T-rescue is a kayaking technique performed to recover a kayaker from a capsize without them having to leave their boat or perform a self-rescue such as a kayak roll. The advantages of this maneuver are that the kayaker does not have to get out of the kayak and the kayak does not then have to be emptied of water. However, it relies on another kayaker being able to assist quickly enough. More advanced kayakers will often prefer to rely on a kayak roll instead.

== Technique ==
After drawing attention to the capsize by banging on the bottom of their boat, the kayaker who capsized waits upside down underwater until another kayak arrives to help. The capsized kayaker finds the other kayak, usually the bow, with their hand and uses this for support while they perform a hip-flick to right their kayak. If the kayaker runs out of breath before being rescued, they will instead need to exit their kayak by releasing their spray deck.
