= Hip-flick =

The hip-flick (sometimes called the hip-snap), is a technique used in kayaking to rotate the boat around its longest axis. It is fundamental to all kayaking techniques that return the boat to upright after a capsize, such as the eskimo roll and eskimo rescue.
