= Edi Hans Pawlata =

Austrian kayaking pioneer (1900–1966)

Hans W Pawlata, known as "Edi", was an Austrian pioneer of the sport of kayaking; who in 1927, claimed to be the first European to perform a Kayak roll, a skill developed by the Eskimo people. In fact, a number of other Europeans had already learned to roll a kayak, but Pawlata is widely credited with the feat.

Born 19 February 1900 in Vienna, Pawlata had a passion for paddling the faltbooten or folding kayaks that were popular in Europe after World War I. He studied written accounts of the kayaks and skills of the Greenlandic Inuit, especially the work of Knud Rasmussen, Fridtjof Nansen and Hjalmar Johansen. From his research, he designed a folding kayak which he believed was "purebred" and more faithful to the original Arctic boats. The 4.9 metre long kayak was built for him by the firm of Otto Hartel in Graz, and he called it "Aijuk". On 30 July 1927, on the Weissensee, he publicly demonstrated his ability to capsize his kayak and right it again without leaving the cockpit. The method he devised, which involved gripping the far end of the paddle blade, is now known as the Pawlata roll and is still used as a training or sea kayaking technique. In the following year, he published a book called "Kipp kipp hurra! Im reinrassigen Kajak. Eine ausführliche Anleitung zum Sichwiederaufrichten im Kajak (Faltboot)" ("Tip tip hooray! In a purebred kayak. A detailed manual for righting oneself in a kayak (folding kayak)") In it he says:

"Quite contrary to the expectations of the old experienced paddler, on 30 July 1927, I succeeded as the first European sportsman to right himself again after capsizing in a kayak. Thus was the curse of the centuries-old Eskimo secret broken and kayaking ceased to exist in name only."

Actually, a number of European missionaries and explorers had previously learned how to roll from the Inuit of Greenland, Paul Egede probably being the first in the 1730s. Rolling was demonstrated in 1889 at Sandviken, Norway by Oluf Dietrichson, a member of Nansen's 1888 Greenland expedition.

Pawlata died in Vienna on 13 December 1966.
