= Kaustubh Khade =

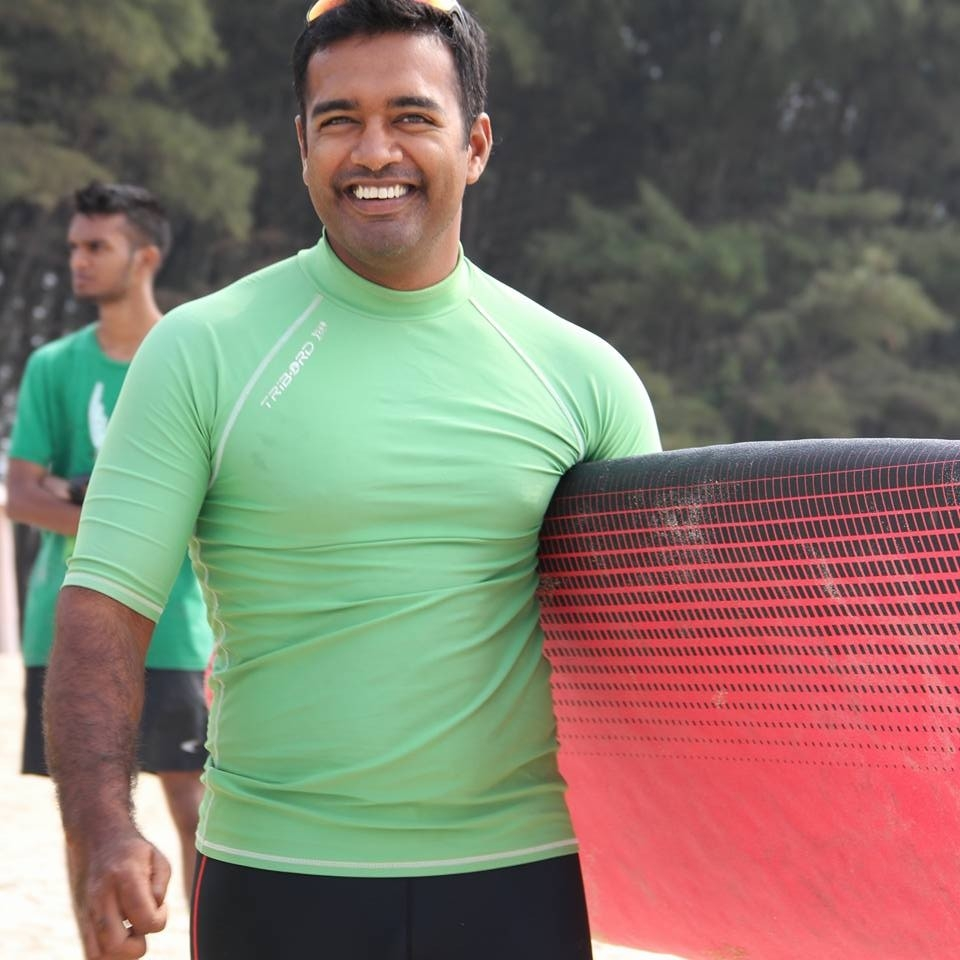
Kaustubh Khade on Day 8 of his expedition- Mumbai to Goa

Kaustubh Khade (born 17 January 1987) is a professional kayaker. After graduating from Indian Institute of Technology Delhi, he took up kayaking as a challenge and in a span of five years, has become one of India's top professional kayakers. Trained under twelve time world Champion for Surfski Kayaking, Oscar Chalupsky, his first major tournament was the 2012 National Championship for Dragon Boat Racing held in Mumbai in which he had one of the best timings of the Championship and qualified for the International Asian Dragon Boat Championship in Thailand. He was part of the Indian contingent that was sent to Thailand, where they managed to secure nine medals, out of which his contribution was two silver and one bronze.

== Kayaking records ==
In 2015, he was entered in the Limca Book of Records when he kayaked solo from Mumbai to Goa in 18 days, covering a distance of 400 kilometres. In 2016, he became the first Indian to kayak 3000 km across the western coastline of India, covering 5 states and one Union Territory from Kutch to Kanyakumari.
