= Spray deck =

Flexible waterproof cover for a boat

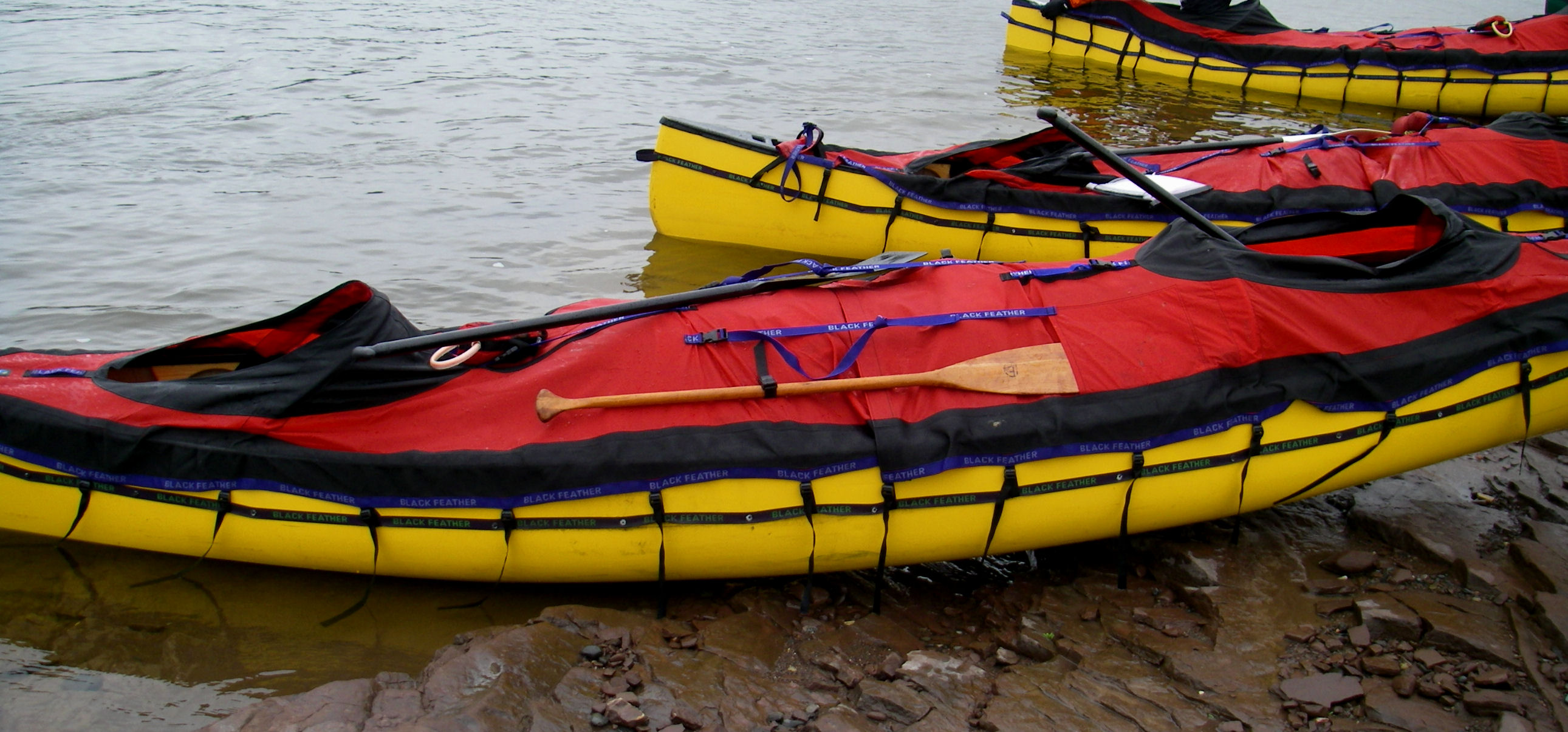
River canoes equipped with spraydecks for rough water

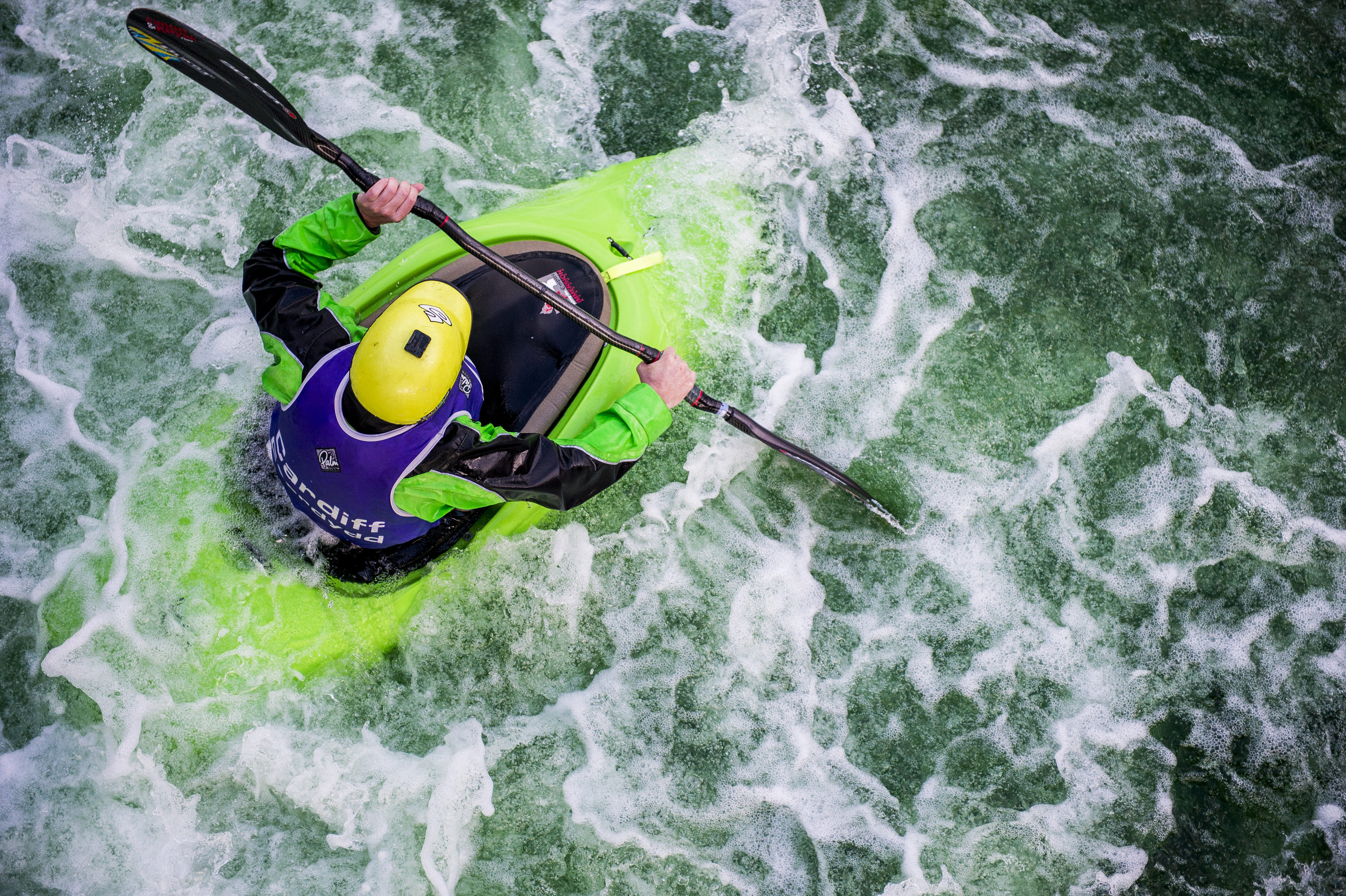
A kayaker with water washing harmlessly over his stern and the rear of his spraydeck.

A spraydeck (sprayskirt in N. America, akuilisaq or tuiitsoq in Greenland) is a flexible waterproof cover for a boat (in particular for a kayak or a canoe) with a hole for the passengers' waist. Spraydecks are used to prevent water from entering the boat while allowing passengers to paddle or row.

Spraydecks are used in breaking waves, on whitewater, in inclement weather, and in splashy sports. An alternative is the tuilik.

== Construction ==
A spraydeck is made of water-tight cloth or neoprene or nylon. It is sized to fit over the opening, or cockpit, of the canoe or kayak, with holes for the waists of the passengers. The spraydeck generally seals around the rim of the cockpit and around the torso of each passenger.

Each opening in a spraydeck must make a fairly watertight seal. The seal varies in quality. The deck can be made to seal in several ways, including elastic fabric, a hem containing an elastic cord and/or drawstring, and both.

== Boat types ==
=== Kayak spraydeck ===
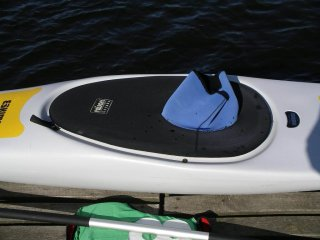
Spraydeck on a kayak.

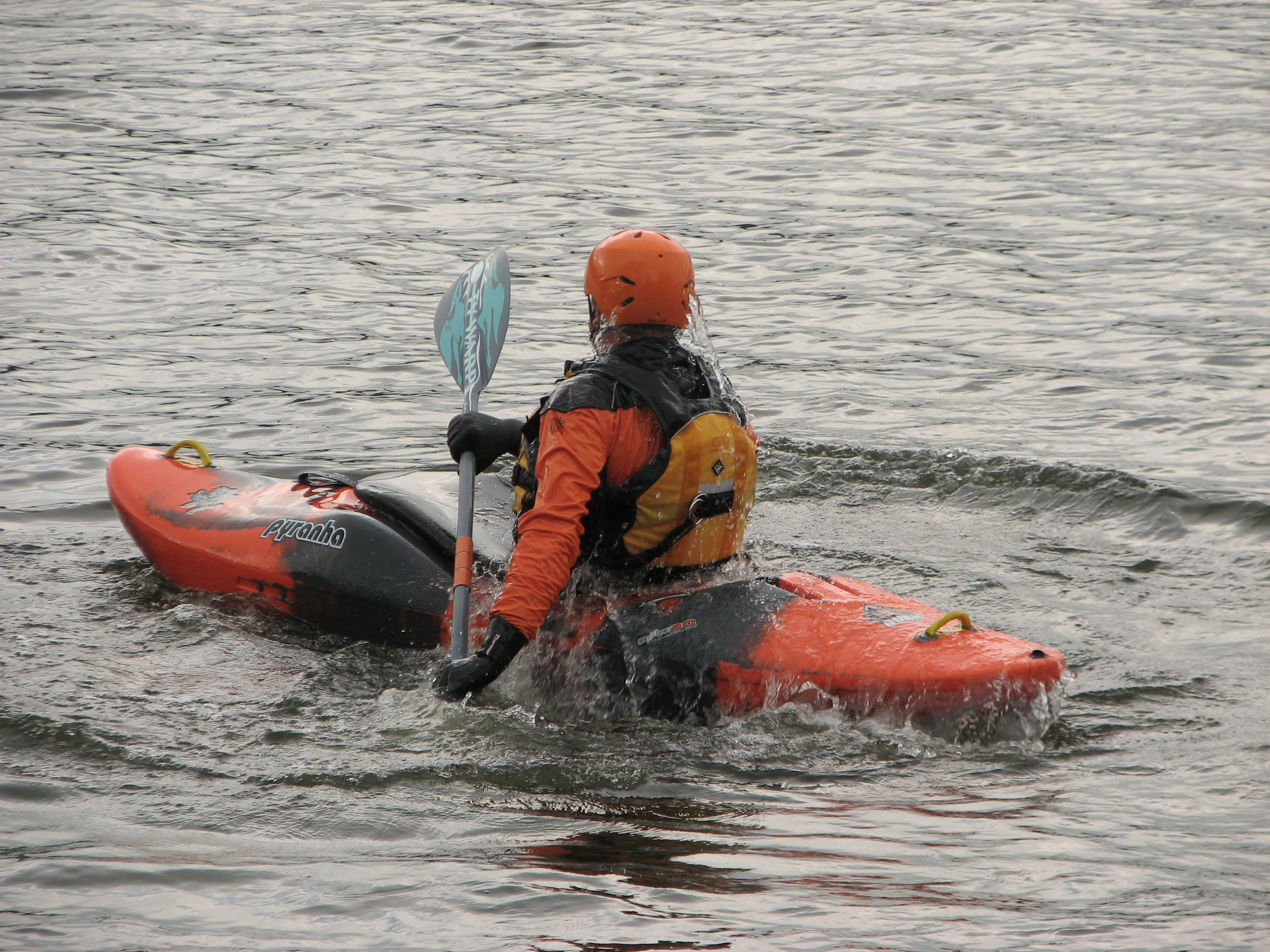
Kayaker coming up from a roll, water cascading off his spraydeck.

Spraydecks are worn by many kayakers in most conditions, but especially on rough water and in inclement weather, to prevent water entering the kayak's cockpit and to help the kayaker roll.

On a kayak, the spraydeck is secured to a rim surrounding the cockpit with a line or elastic string called a rand. The line or string often runs inside the hem along the edge of the spraydeck. Alternatively elastic cord is attached directly to the edge of the spraydeck, and is tightened around the rim of the kayak's cockpit or stretched over it.

The fastening may be pulled tight or held so by its elasticity, this prevents water infiltration while allowing the kayaker to quickly release it if the boat should capsize: a so-called wet exit. To aid easy release during a capsize, a grab loop is attached at the front of the spraydeck, which the kayaker can use to pull the spraydeck free. A properly sealed spraydeck will allow a kayaker to perform an eskimo roll and continue paddling without having to bail out.

A kayaker's spraydeck is also known as a "sprayskirt", because it is donned like a skirt before entering the boat. "Sprayskirt" is the more common term in the US.

Spraydecks for traditional kayaks are narrower, to fit narrow custom-fitted cockpits; mass-produced kayaks have larger cockpits and the spraydeck must therefore be wider at the hem.

=== Canoe spraydeck ===
On a canoe, the spraydeck is secured to the outside of the hull with string or cords to either adhered or riveted installation loops or a perimeter webbing band specifically installed for this purpose. Modern designs have many features for safety and convenience such as map and paddle pockets, access openings, and tie-down straps.

Like a kayak, a spray deck can help allow a canoeist to perform a roll (provided he/she is strapped to the canoe) and continue paddling without having to bail out. But this maneuver is much more difficult and requires advanced skills.

On a canoe, it is not only a safety item but may also be used for comfort. During rainy, windy and or cold weather, it keeps the lower body of the canoeist drier, warmer, and helps prevent water from building up a puddle at the bottom of the boat.

== Materials ==
The most appropriate material depends on the temperature/time of year and on the type of water being paddled. Whitewater spraydecks are made totally from neoprene, whereas flatwater touring/sea kayak spraydecks may be made from either material.

=== Sealskin ===
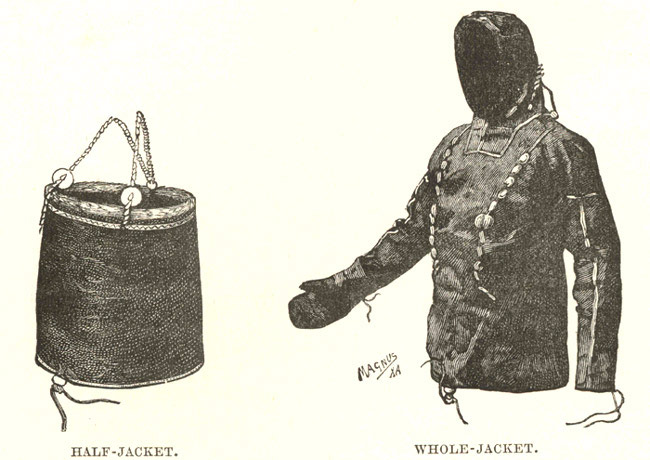
Traditional akuilisaq (left) and tuilik (right), ~1893 sketch.

Sealskin is a traditional material for spraydecks. It requires labor-intensive preparation. A European description:

In fair weather the kaiak-man uses the so-called half-jacket (akuilisak). This is made of water-tight skin with the hair removed, and is sewn with sinews. Round its lower margin runs a draw-string, or rather a draw-thong, by means of which the edge of the jacket can be made to fit so closely to the edge of the kaiak-ring that it can only be pressed and down down over it with some little trouble. This done, the half-jacket forms, as it were, a water-tight extension of the kaiak. The upper part of the jacket comes close up to the armpits of the kaiak-man, and is supported by braces or straps, which pass over the shoulders and can be lengthened or shortened by means of handy runners or buckles of bone, so simple and yet so ingenious that we, with all our metal buckles and so forth, cannot equal them. Loose sleeves of skin are drawn up over the arms, and are lashed to the overarm and to the wrist, thus preventing the arm from becoming wet. Watertight mittens of skin are drawn over the hands. This half-jacket is enough to keep out the smaller waves which wash over the kaiak. In a heavier sea, on the other hand, a whole-jacket (tuilik) is used. This is made in the same way as the half-jacket, and, like it, fits close to the kayak-ring, but is longer above, has sleeves attached to it, and a hood that comes right over the head. It is laced tight around the face and wrists, so that with it on the kaiak-man can go right through the breakers and can capsize and right himself again, without getting wet and without letting a drop of water into the kaiak.

—Fridtjof Nansen, "Eskimo Life", 1893, English translation by William Archer

=== Gut ===
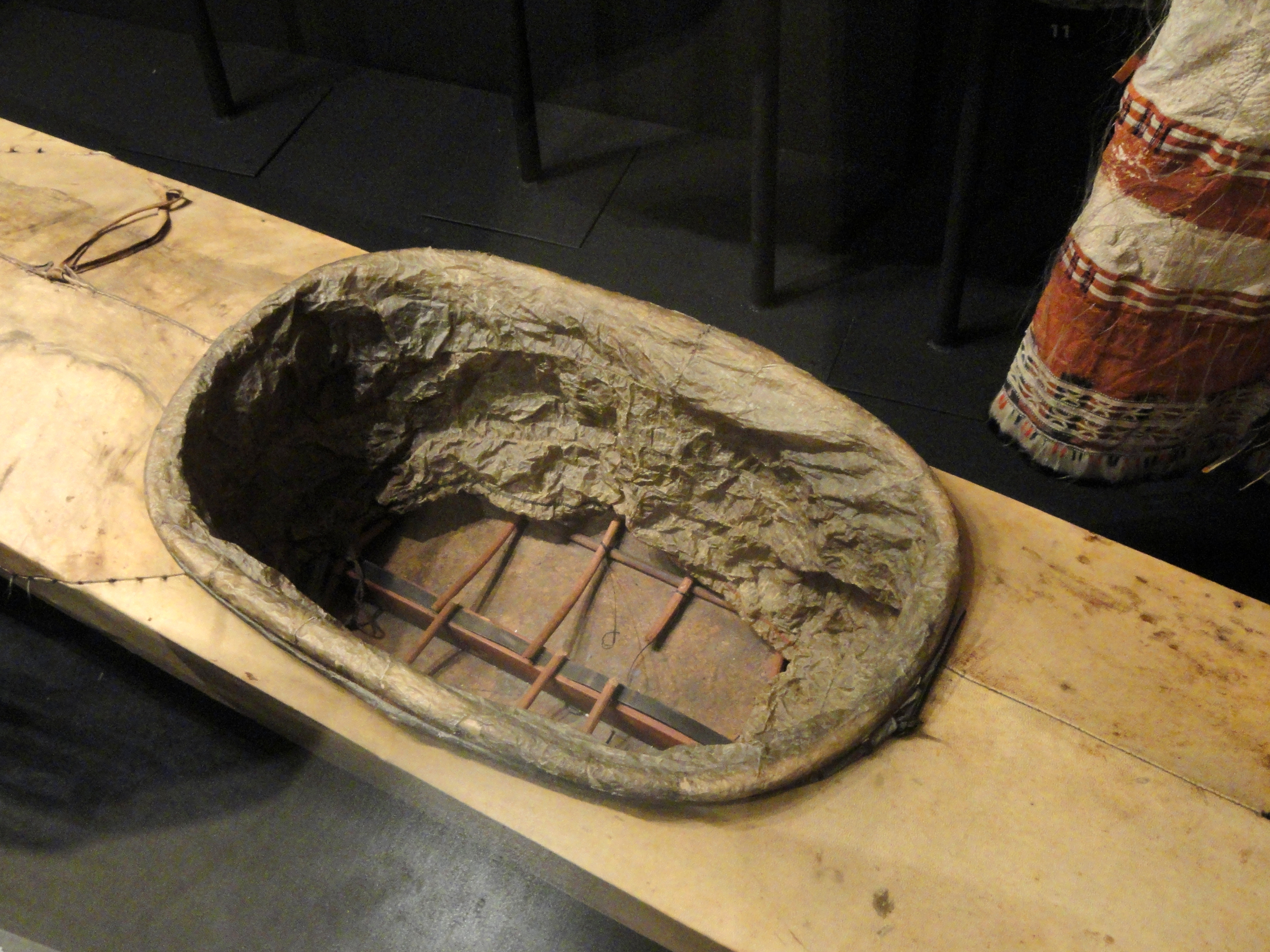
A (probably Yupik?) kayak with a translucent gut sprayskirt attached to the coaming. The ribs have broken (probably due to the skin shrinking).

Sprayskirts (and tuiliks) can also be made of gut from the intestines of sea mammals or bears. The gut is turned inside-out to clean both sides, then inflated to dry. Inflated gut dries quickly. If it is dried in cold, dark, windy weather, it becomes opaque and white, and is known as "winter gut". "Summer gut" is yellowish and transparent, and stiffer. The gut is then slit open lengthwise and the strips are sewn into a garment. The smoother inside of the gut becomes the outside of the garment.

=== Neoprene ===
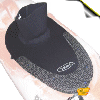

Neoprene spray decks are snug, elastic, and tight fitting on the kayak or canoe cockpit, and have very little or no leakage when well fitted. They sit tight across the cockpit rim with little sag, so water sheds quickly rather than pools on their surface. They typically remain in place during water impact better than other types, so are the usual choice for white water rivers, surf, and sea kayaking. They remain in place during paddler actions of rolling and bracing. They are warm to wear, due to the neoprene tube around waist and lower trunk. They come in many sizes, to suit the shape and size of the cockpit rim and the waist of the wearer. The rim of a neoprene spray deck is elasticated, typically with either shock cord, or a rubber/elastomer rand. Models designed for casual use to just prevent splashes from entering the craft will typically have light shock-cord, making them easy to fit. Models designed for severe use such as for descending waterfalls are heavily elasticated so they remain in place, but require significant arm strength to fit. Neoprene spray decks may be fitted with additional reinforcement of wear resistant fabric on the front part of the deck, to reduce damage during boat-to-boat rescue and emptying.

=== Nylon ===
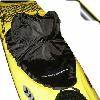

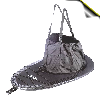

Nylon spraydecks are easy to attach, easy to remove, offer adequate seal to keep water out, comfortable, sometimes breathable, sometimes waterproof and are used during warmer conditions. They will either have neoprene or nylon for the torso. Nylon spraydecks are less commonly used during rough conditions as they are not as tightly fitted so are more likely to accidentally become free. Permeable cloth is polyurethane-coated or teflon-coated to waterproof it.

=== Other materials ===
Some spraydecks are made from both nylon and neoprene. Whitewater spraydecks often have additional features to ensure the best seal and greatest robustness. Latex may be coated on the underside of the deck to grip the cockpit better and/or a protective material (e.g. Kevlar) added to the surface of the deck to provide abrasion resistance.

== See also ==
- Tuilik
- Skirtfit, a free and open database of kayak rim sizing
