= Sean Collins (surfing) =

American surfer and meteoroligist

- Born: Sean Robb Collins; April 8, 1952; Pasadena, California, U.S.
- Died: December 26, 2011 (aged 59); Newport Beach, California, U.S.
- Occupation: Surfer
- Known for: Founder of Surfline

Sean Robb Collins (April 8, 1952 – December 26, 2011) was the American founder of Surfline and a noted figure in the areas of surfing and surf forecasting.

== Biography ==
Collins was born in Pasadena, California. His father, Whitney Collins, was a former Navy lieutenant who enjoyed sailboat racing and owned a 45-foot Newporter ketch, "Leprechaun", berthed in the Long Beach marina and biking distance from Collins' Long Beach home. Collins' early experiences sailing with his father instilled a passion for the ocean and meteorology. Much of his knowledge of meteorology was self-taught. While Long Beach has almost no surf because of its breakwater, Collins was part of a vibrant surf culture at Woodrow Wilson high school (class of 1970), where surf film director Bruce Brown graduated earlier, and world-class woman surfer, Jericho Poppler, was a classmate.

In the early years of Collins' surf forecasting he would record weather reports and forecasts from the Southern Hemisphere, which he received via shortwave radio. He also studied charts and data from the National Weather Service library. By comparing these various data sources with his observations of the surf, he devised formulas for predicting how global weather events would affect near-shore surf conditions; these models were eventually combined into a set of swell-modeling algorithms nicknamed "LOLA".

In the 1970s, Collins spent extensive time traveling and surfing in Mexico. He converted marine weather forecasting equipment for use in an automobile so that he would have advance knowledge of where swells and offshore weather patterns were developing, and in turn used that information to find the best locations for surfing.

In 1985, Collin's founded a surf report service called Surfline. The company started as a call-in service, which provided verbal condition reports for various surf breaks around Southern California. In 1995, Surfline moved online, offering live video streams of surf breaks in addition to written surf reports.

Surfline eventually expanded to offer editorial coverage of surfing, and is now one of the most prominent websites related to the sport.

== Recognitions ==
In 1999, Collins was named one of the "25 Most Influential Surfers of the Century" by Surfer magazine. In 2006, he was named "one of the 100 most powerful people in Southern California" by The Los Angeles Times' West Magazine, for his influence on the region's surfers.

In 2008, in honor of his contributions to surf forecasting, Collins was inducted into the Surfers' Hall of Fame in Huntington Beach, California.

In 2012, Collins was inducted into the Surfer's Walk of Fame and received the Surf Culture Award in Huntington Beach, California.

In August 2012, Sean Collins was honored with a Lifetime Achievement Award at the SIMA Waterman's Ball in Laguna Niguel, California.

== Death ==
He died on December 26, 2011, in Newport Beach, California, aged 59, from a heart attack. His death was memorialized by a paddle out by about 200 surfers in what was described as the "biggest memorial tribute ever held for a surfer in Huntington Beach", with about 2,000 people in attendance.
