= Surfline =

US Surf forecasting website

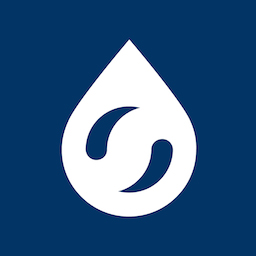
- Company type: Private
- Founded: Southern California - 1985
- Founder: Sean Collins
- Headquarters: Huntington Beach, California, U.S.
- Area served: Worldwide
- Key people: Kyle Laughlin (CEO)
- Website: surfline.com

Surfline is a company and website based in Huntington Beach, California, that specializes in surf forecasting and surf reports, live webcasting, photography, videography, as well as editorial coverage of the sport of surfing. Surfline.com is now ranked 1,180 in the US and 5,784 in the world in terms of popularity compared to other websites and is now the largest provider of streaming HD coastal cams. Since 2003 it has taken on buoyweather.com and fishtrack.com (2012), on average the family of websites receives 175,000 visitors per day. The site includes streaming video, surf reports and forecasts. Surfline.com offers over 500 streaming cameras at 150 surf breaks, and is one of the larger surf cam websites. Surfline currently has approximately 50 employees.

== History ==
Surfline was founded in 1985 as a pay-per-call telephone surf report based on weather, the National Weather Service's buoy data, and telephone reports from young surfers that travelled to beach sites to observe the waves in-person. Callers heard a 90-second recorded message with information about the size, duration, and angle of waves at 22 California surfing locations. Surfline was founded by Southern California surfer Jerry Arnold and David Wilk. Surfline was the first significant use of technology to aid in finding the best surfing conditions. Previously, surfers used tips from local surfing stores or friends that live within eye-sight of the beach. At first, Surfline got about 900 calls per-day.

Surfline hired Sean Collins as its chief forecaster in 1984. Collins played a role in Surfline's growth, after he accurately predicted wave conditions in South America a week in advance, while the waves were still six thousand miles away from coastal surfing locations. This forecast also triggered a backlash against Surfline and services like it, for overcrowding beaches with the best waves and taking the search for waves out of the surfing experience. However, interest in surf forecasting services like Surfline continued to increase. Collins later left Surfline and started a competing company called Wavetrak, that was merged with Surfline in 1990. Through the merger, Collins became a co-owner of Surfline, then purchased complete ownership in 1990. Collins helped develop Surfline's early methodologies for predicting surfing conditions, before dying in 2011.

By 1991, Surfline was providing more than one million phone-based surf reports a year. In 1992, it started distributing surf reports via fax and pagers, before moving on to internet-based services. In 1995 Surfline became an online service, offering live video streams of surf breaks in addition to written surf reports. The first live camera feed was created in 1996 at Huntington Beach. Around this time, Surfline started doing forecasting work for special events, contests, and surf magazines, as well as lifeguard organizations and government agencies like the U.S. Coast Guard. In March 2000, Surfline was acquired by surf website Swell.com.

By the early 2000s, Surfline provided data for 37 beaches in California, four in Hawaii, 17 in Florida, and 20 others predominantly on the East Coast. It had 350,000 monthly visitors in 2000 and 500,000 by 2002. By 2002, it had about 15 employees and 30 contract surfers that visit beaches in-person to provide reports on surfing conditions. Surfline developed its own software to predict waves. In 2006, Surfline installed its own buoy system to track waves offshore.

Around 2007, Surfline acquired the website Buoyweather.com. In 2007, Surfline expanded its network of beach cameras and created its first Surfline smartphone apps. This was followed by the acquisition of FishTrack.com in 2012. Fishtrack.com was the Surfline.com equivalent, but for fishing, instead of surfing. In 2017, Surfline acquired Magicseaweed, a United Kingdom-based company founded in 2002 and focused on forecasting surf conditions in more than 200 countries. In 2017, Jeff Berg was appointed CEO, followed by Kyle Laughlin in 2020. In 2020, the company raised $30 million in venture capital funding from The Chernin Group. In 2021, Surfline reworked its wave forecasting engine, incorporating artificial intelligence and machine learning. It also advised the 2021 Olympic Committee on anticipated wave conditions at the first olympic surfing competition.

== Impacts on surf culture ==
The introduction of Surfline.com and the increase in reliance on the real time footage has changed surfers' lifestyles. With the advances in the technologies and ability to predict the surfing conditions at various spots it has given surfers the ability to make future plans and make decisions about where to surf or if it's worth it to go anywhere. It used to be that surfers relied on word of mouth, seasonal tendencies or tides to know what the surf was going to be like. Some would take days off from work based on this unreliable information and then be disappointed when there were no waves that day or there would be days where the surf was ideal and surfers would miss it altogether. Surfer magazine’s editor Brendon Thomas has said in response to this shift, “I’m not saying that’s necessarily a good thing, but it’s true.” Another aspect of surf culture that is seeing some controversy is dealing with new crowds. There is a strong “Locals Only” mentality in different surf spots around the world. Surfers have blamed Surfline.com and live surf reporting as a contributor to the increase of crowds at surf breaks. The locals were so upset that there was suspicion that some of the surfers in New Jersey even planned to get back by hiding and/or breaking the camera.
