= Surfboard leash =

Urethane cord attached to a surfboard

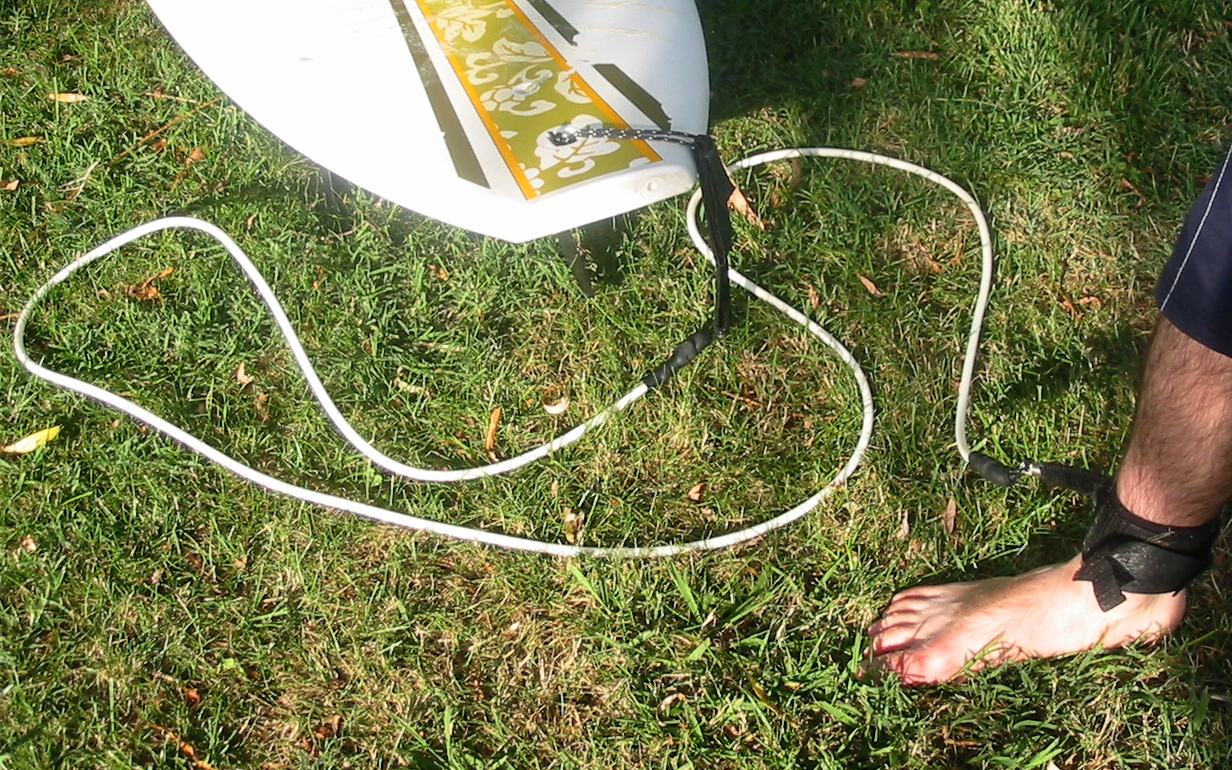
- Surf Leash

A leg rope or surfboard leash is a urethane cord attached to the deck of a surfboard, down near the tail. It prevents the surfboard from being swept away by waves and stops runaway surfboards from hitting other surfers and swimmers. Modern leashes consist of a urethane cord where one end has a band with a velcro strap attached to the surfer's trailing foot, and the opposite has a velcro strap attached to the tail end of the surfboard. Should the surfer fall while riding a wave, the surfboard will not be swept away, thus allowing the surfer to quickly recover the surfboard and return to the take-off zone.

== Background ==
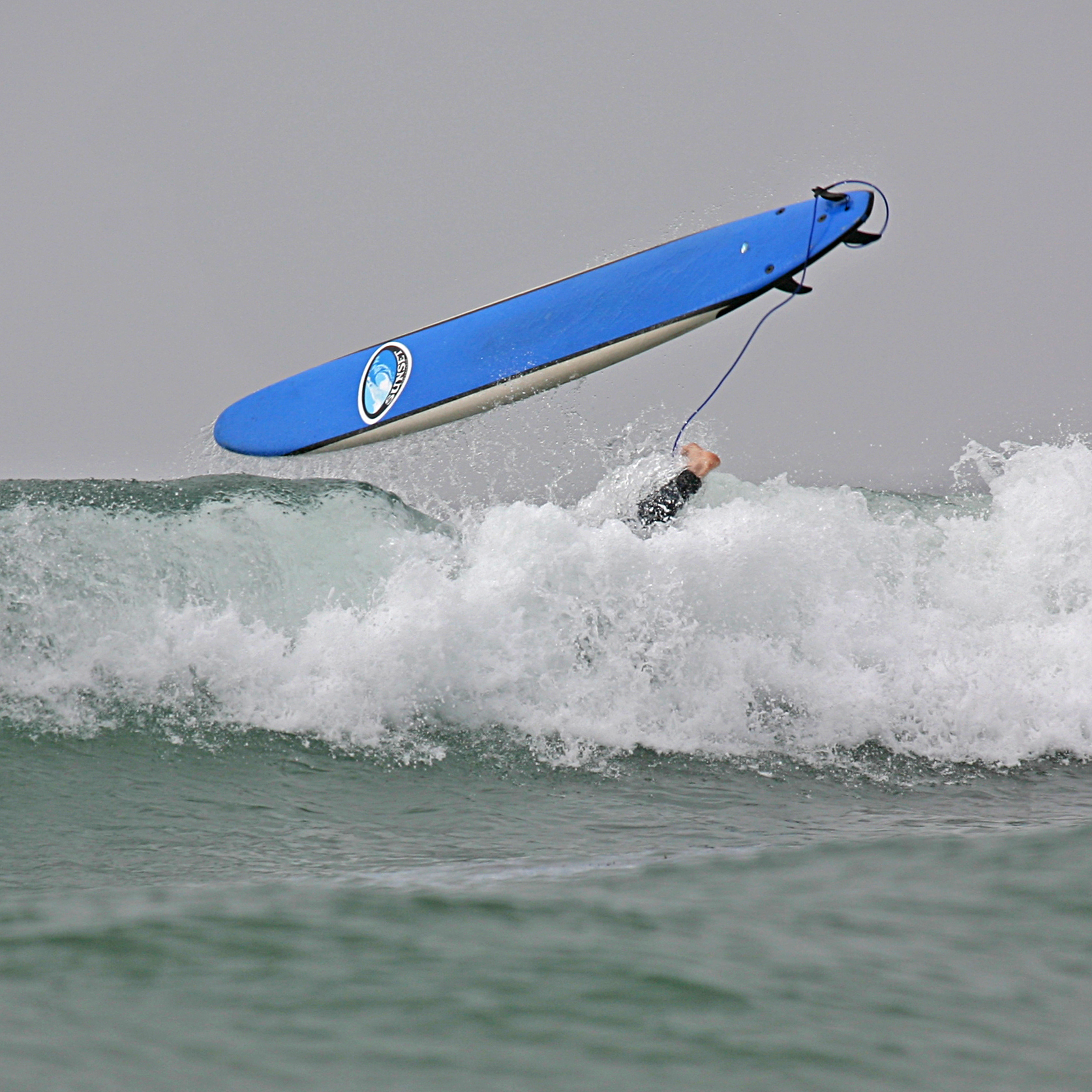
leash in use

The leash was invented in the 1970s amidst controversy that it was a dangerous accessory. Prior to leashes introduction in 1971, surfers who fell off their boards had to swim to retrieve them with runaway boards being an inconvenience to the surfer and a danger to other surfers. Initially, people expressed concern that if a surfer fell while riding a wave and wearing a leg rope, the surfboard may bounce back and hit the surfer causing serious injury. Although this can happen, most surfers today choose to use a leg rope while surfing as it is believed that leg ropes prevent more accidents than they cause.

Santa Cruz resident Pat O'Neill (son of surfer Jack O'Neill, inventor of the O'Neill Wetsuit) is credited with inventing the surf leash. His initial designs consisted of surgical cord attached to a board with a suction cup. At the 1971 Malibu international surfing competition, Pat offered leashes to his competitors in the event. Consequently, he was disqualified from the event for wearing his leash, dubbed a kook cord by those at the event however over the next year, the leash became a ubiquitous tool in the surfing world.

Pat's father, Jack O'Neill, lost his left eye in a surf leash accident as the surgical tubing used in the early designs allowed the leash to overstretch, causing the surfboard to fly back towards the surfer. Subsequent cords were made with less elastic materials such as bungee cords.

The first leg rope on the surfboard was created by Peter Wright, in Raglan, New Zealand. It was established in the very early 1970s. It consisted of [nylon]. He is not credited for his efforts because he did not copyright the leg rope. The urethane design was patented by David Hattrick. Later in the 1970s, he established Pipe Lines surfing products and developed a design that could be patented. This design also won an Australian Design Award in 1979.

== Structure ==
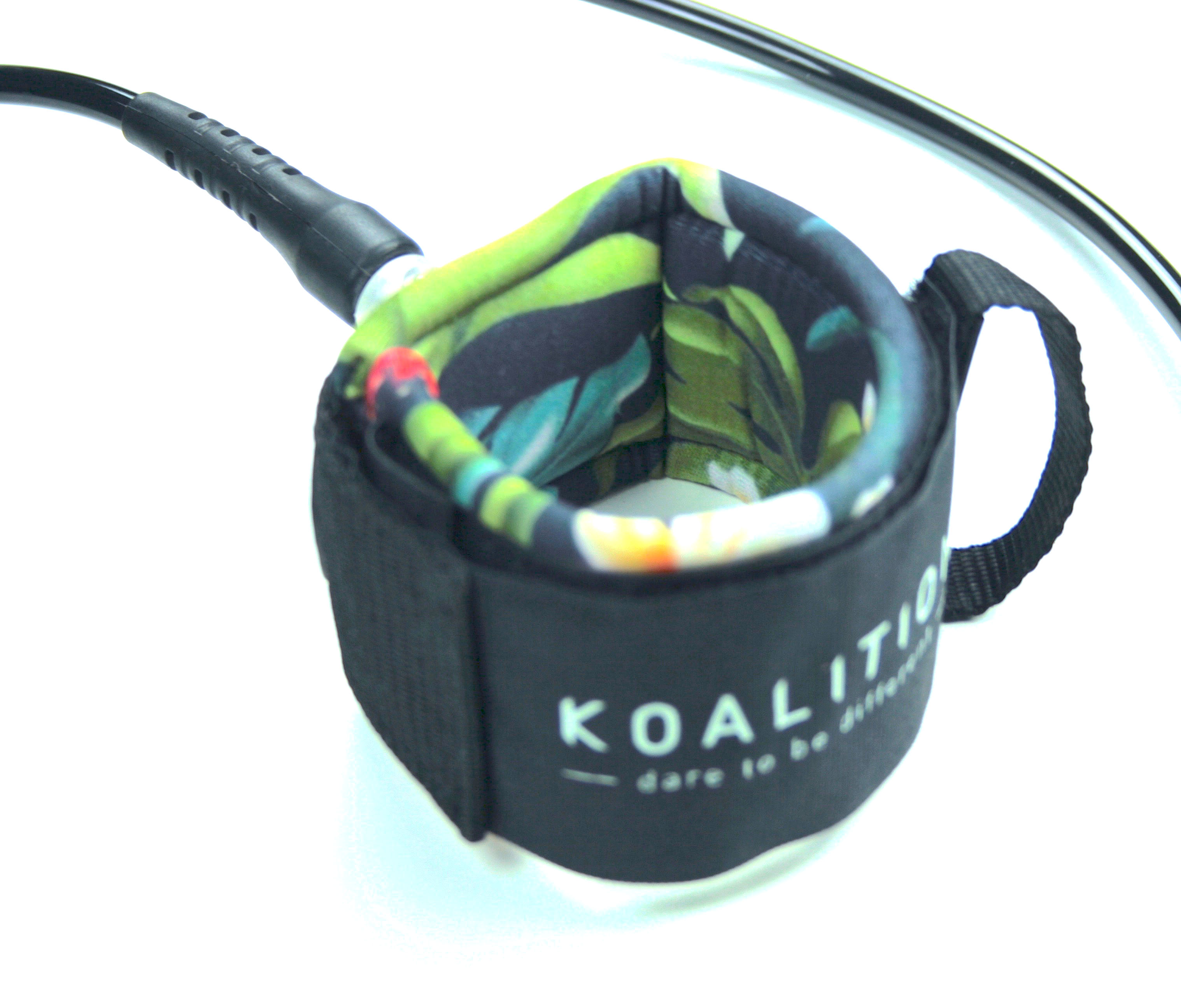
cuff

Modern leg rope consists of four parts cuff, swivel, cord and rail saver. The cuff comes with a double wrap-around velcro cuff. The swivel allows the cuff to spin and twist without the rope itself twisting or tangling providing less strain on the rope. The cords are typically made from a high-quality polyurethane and typically come in 2 thicknesses. However, the thicker leg ropes has more drag in the water. The rails saver is designed to provide a secured connection to the board and protect the rail when a surfer falls.

A leash cup, also known as a "leash plug", is an indentation in the deck of the board close to the tail that contains a small metal bar that a short cord can be girth hitched to for attaching a leash.
