= Surfing =

Sport of riding waves

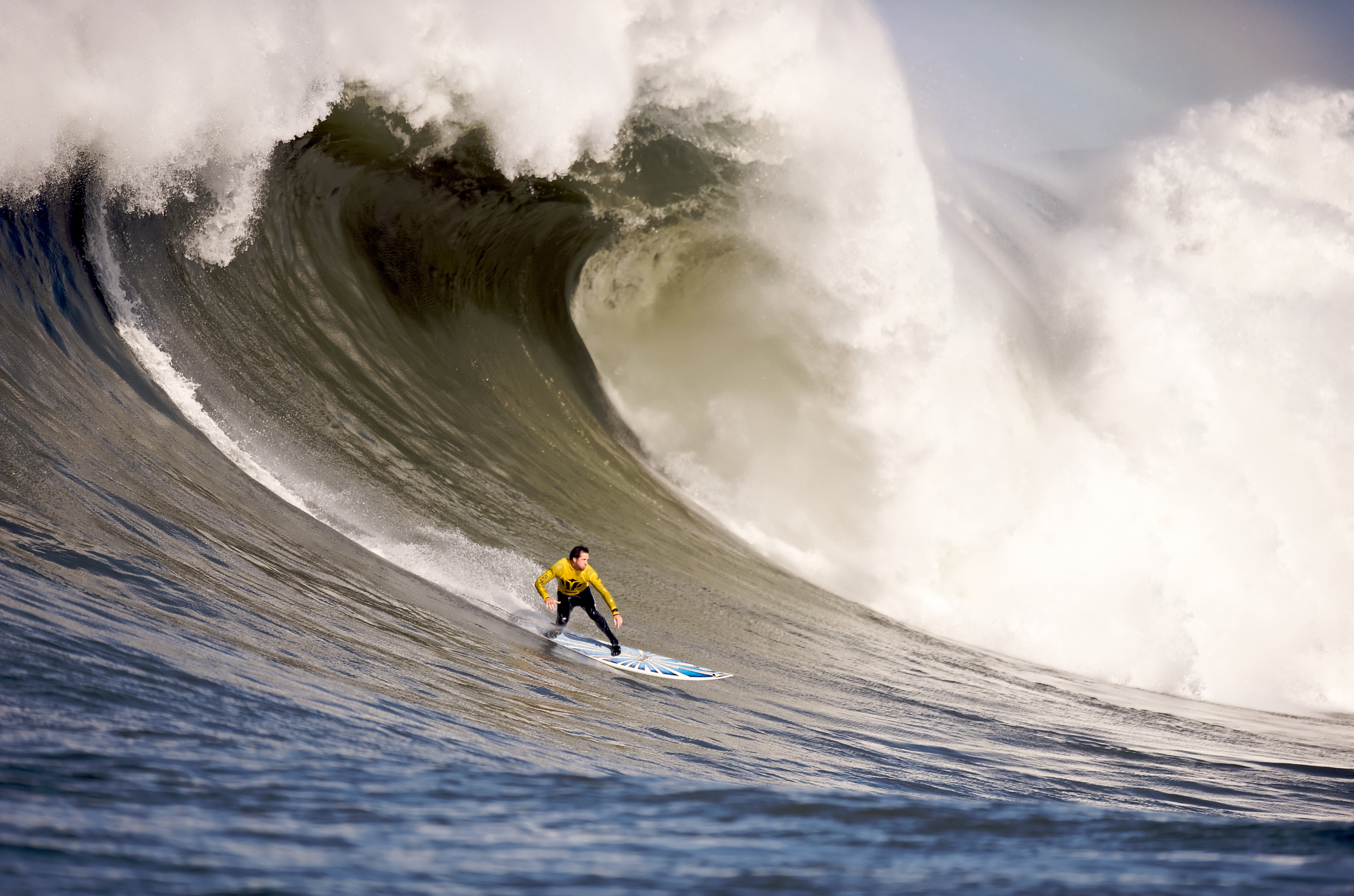
- Mavericks Surf Contest 2010
- Highest governing body: World Surf League (WSL), International Surfing Association (ISA)

Characteristics
- Mixed-sex: Yes, separate competitions
- Equipment: Surfboard, leash, wetsuit

Presence
- Country or region: Worldwide
- Olympic: Since 2020

Pictogram for Surfing at the Summer Olympics

Surfing is a surface water sport in which an individual, a surfer, uses a board to ride on the forward section, or face, of a moving wave of water, which usually carries the surfer towards the shore. Waves suitable for surfing are primarily found on ocean shores, but can also be found as standing waves in the open ocean, in lakes, in rivers in the form of a tidal bore, or wave pools.

Surfing includes all forms of wave-riding using a board, regardless of the stance. There are several types of boards. The Moche of Peru would often surf on reed craft, while the native peoples of the Pacific surfed waves on alaia, paipo, and other such watercraft. Ancient cultures often surfed on their belly and knees, while modern-day surfing is most often stand-up surfing, in which a surfer rides a wave while standing on a surfboard.

Body surfing, in which the wave is caught and ridden using the surfer's own body rather than a board, is very common and is considered by some surfers to be the purest form of surfing. The closest form of body surfing using a board is a handboard which normally has one strap over it to fit on one hand. Surfers who body board, body surf, or handboard feel more drag as they move through the water than stand up surfers do. This holds body surfers into a more turbulent part of the wave (often completely submerged by whitewater). In contrast, surfers who instead ride a hydrofoil feel substantially less drag and may ride unbroken waves in the open ocean.

Three major subdivisions within stand-up surfing are stand-up paddling, long boarding and short boarding with several major differences including the board design and length, the riding style and the kind of wave that is ridden.

In tow-in surfing (most often, but not exclusively, associated with big wave surfing), a motorized water vehicle such as a personal watercraft, tows the surfer into the wave front, helping the surfer match a large wave's speed, which is generally a higher speed than a self-propelled surfer can produce. Surfing-related sports such as paddle boarding and sea kayaking that are self-propelled by hand paddles do not require waves, and other derivative sports such as kite surfing and windsurfing rely primarily on wind for power, yet all of these platforms may also be used to ride waves. Recently with the use of V-drive boats, wakesurfing, in which one surfs on the wake of a boat, has emerged. As of 2023, the Guinness Book of World Records recognized a 26.2 m (86 ft) wave ride by Sebastian Steudtner in Nazaré, Portugal, as the largest wave ever surfed.

During the winter season in the northern hemisphere, the North Shore of Oahu, the third-largest island of Hawaii, is known for having some of the best waves in the world. Surfers from around the world flock to breaks like Backdoor, Waimea Bay, and Pipeline. However, there are still many popular surf spots around the world: Teahupo'o, located off the coast of Tahiti; Mavericks, California, United States; Cloudbreak, Tavarua Island, Fiji; Superbank, Gold Coast, Australia.

In 2016, surfing was added by the International Olympic Committee (IOC) as an Olympic sport to begin at the 2020 Summer Olympics in Japan. The first gold medalists of the Tokyo 2020 surfing men and women's competitions were, respectively, the Brazilian Ítalo Ferreira and the American from Hawaii, Carissa Moore.

== Origins and history ==
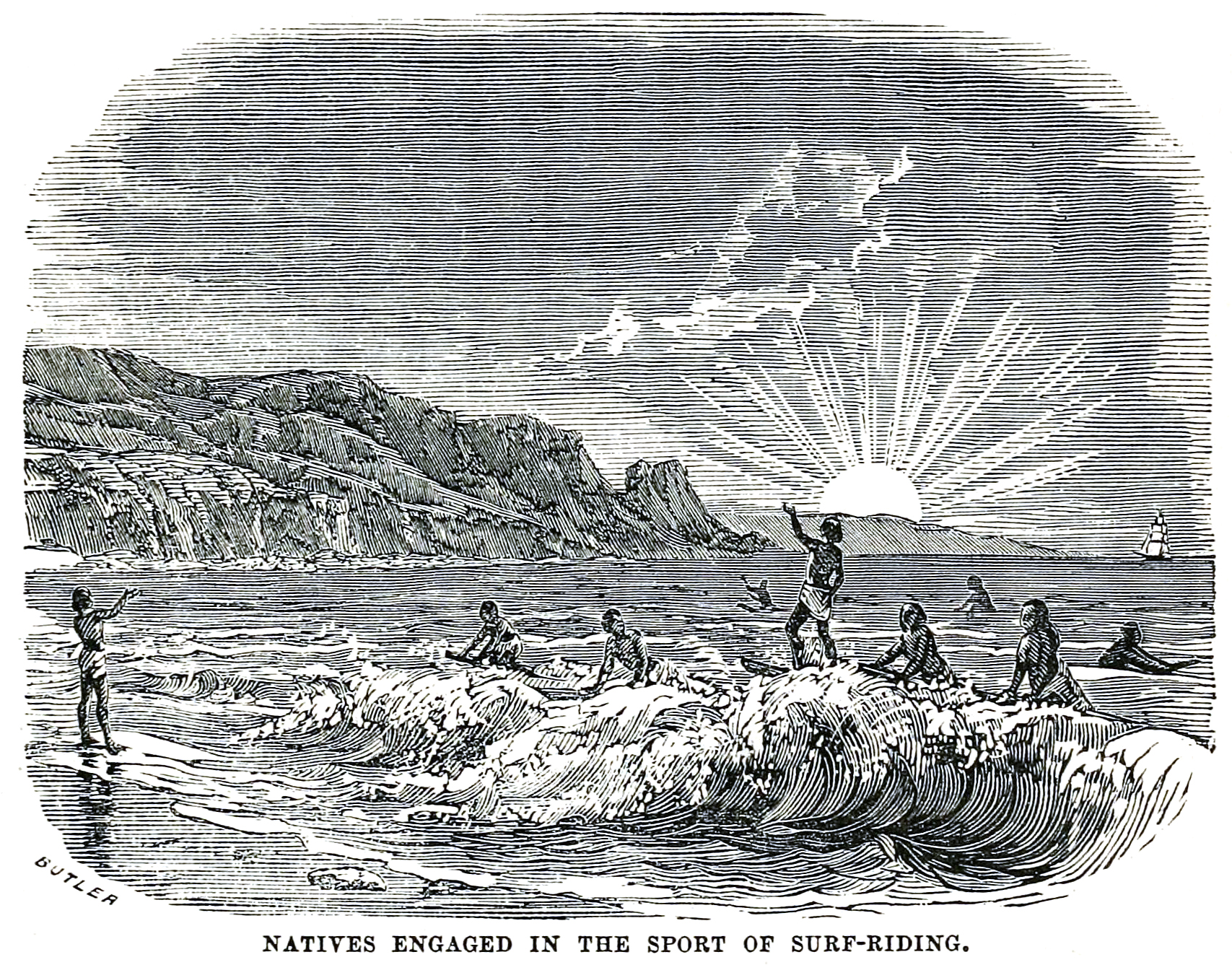
1858 illustration of "surf-riding" in Hawaii.

The riding of waves has likely existed since humans began swimming in the ocean. In this sense, bodysurfing is the oldest type of wave-catching. Undoubtedly ancient sailors learned how to ride wave energy on many styles of early boats. However, standing up on what is now called a surfboard is a relatively recent innovation developed by the Polynesians. The influences for modern surfing can be directly traced to the surfers of pre-contact Hawaii.

=== Peru ===
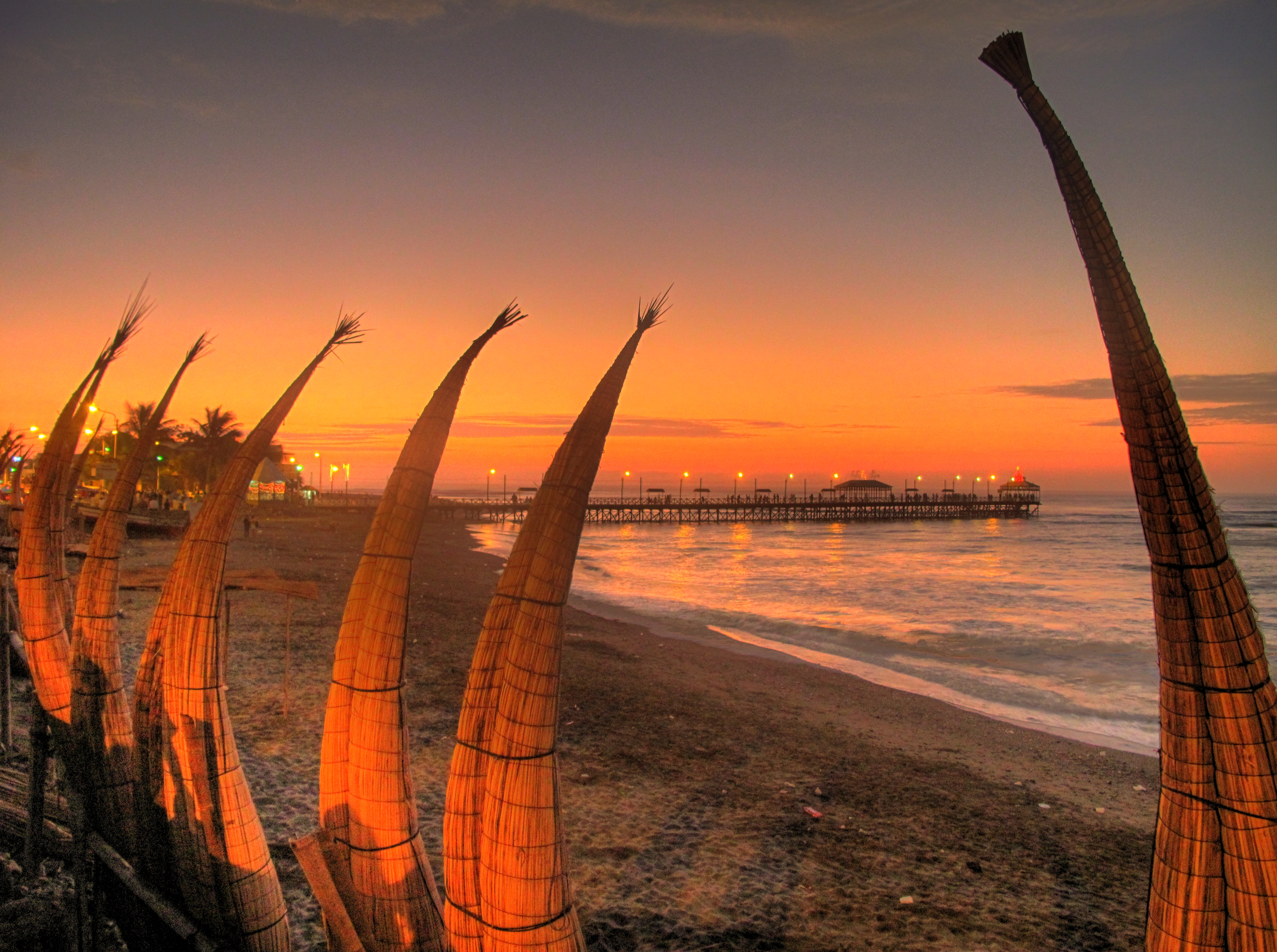
Caballitos de totora, reed watercraft used by fishermen for the past 3000 years at Huanchaco, Peru, known for its surf breaks

About three to five thousand years ago, cultures in ancient Peru fished in kayak-like watercraft (mochica) made of reeds that the fishermen surfed back to shore. The Moche culture used the caballito de totora (little horse of totora), with archaeological evidence showing its use around 200 CE. An early description of the Inca surfing in Callao was documented by Jesuit missionary José de Acosta in his 1590 publication Historia natural y moral de las Indias, writing:

It is true to see them go fishing in Callao de Lima, was for me a thing of great recreation, because there were many and each one in a balsilla caballero, or sitting stubbornly cutting the waves of the sea, which is rough where they fish, they looked like the Tritons, or Neptunes, who paint upon the water.

=== Polynesia ===
In Polynesian culture, surfing was an important activity. Modern surfing as we know it today is thought to have originated in Hawaii. The history of surfing dates to c. AD 400 in Polynesia, where Polynesians began to make their way to the Hawaiian Islands from Tahiti and the Marquesas Islands. They brought many of their customs with them including playing in the surf on Paipo (belly/body) boards. It was in Hawaii that the art of standing and surfing upright on boards was invented.

Various European explorers witnessed surfing in Polynesia. Surfing may have been observed by British explorers at Tahiti in 1767. Samuel Wallis and the crew members of HMS Dolphin were the first Britons to visit the island in June of that year. Another candidate is the botanist Joseph Banks who was part of the first voyage of James Cook on HMS Endeavour, arriving on Tahiti on 10 April 1769. Lieutenant James King was the first person to write about the art of surfing on Hawaii, when he was completing the journals of Captain James Cook (upon Cook's death in 1779).

In Herman Melville's 1849 novel Mardi, based on his experiences in Polynesia earlier that decade, the narrator describes the "Rare Sport at Ohonoo" (title of chap. 90): "For this sport, a surf-board is indispensable: some five feet in length; the width of a man's body; convex on both sides; highly polished; and rounded at the ends. It is held in high estimation; invariably oiled after use; and hung up conspicuously in the dwelling of the owner." When Mark Twain visited Hawaii in 1866 he wrote, "In one place, we came upon a large company of naked natives of both sexes and all ages, amusing themselves with the national pastime of surf-bathing."

References to surf riding on planks and single canoe hulls are also verified for pre-contact Samoa, where surfing was called fa'ase'e or se'egalu (see Augustin Krämer, The Samoa Islands), and Tonga, far pre-dating the practice of surfing by Hawaiians and eastern Polynesians by over a thousand years.

=== West Africa ===
West Africans (e.g., Ghana, Ivory Coast, Liberia, Senegal) and western Central Africans (e.g., Cameroon) independently developed the skill of surfing. Amid the 1640s CE, Michael Hemmersam provided an account of surfing in the Gold Coast: "the parents 'tie their children to boards and throw them into the water.'" In 1679 CE, Barbot provided an account of surfing among Elmina children in Ghana: "children at Elmina learned "to swim, on bits of boards, or small bundles of rushes, fasten'd under their stomachs, which is a good diversion to the spectators." James Alexander provided an account of surfing in Accra, Ghana in 1834 CE: "From the beach, meanwhile, might be seen boys swimming into the sea, with light boards under their stomachs. They waited for a surf; and came rolling like a cloud on top of it. But I was told that sharks occasionally dart in behind the rocks and 'yam' them." Thomas Hutchinson provided an account of surfing in southern Cameroon in 1861: "Fishermen rode small dugouts 'no more than six feet in length, fourteen to sixteen inches in width, and from four to six inches in depth.'"

=== California ===
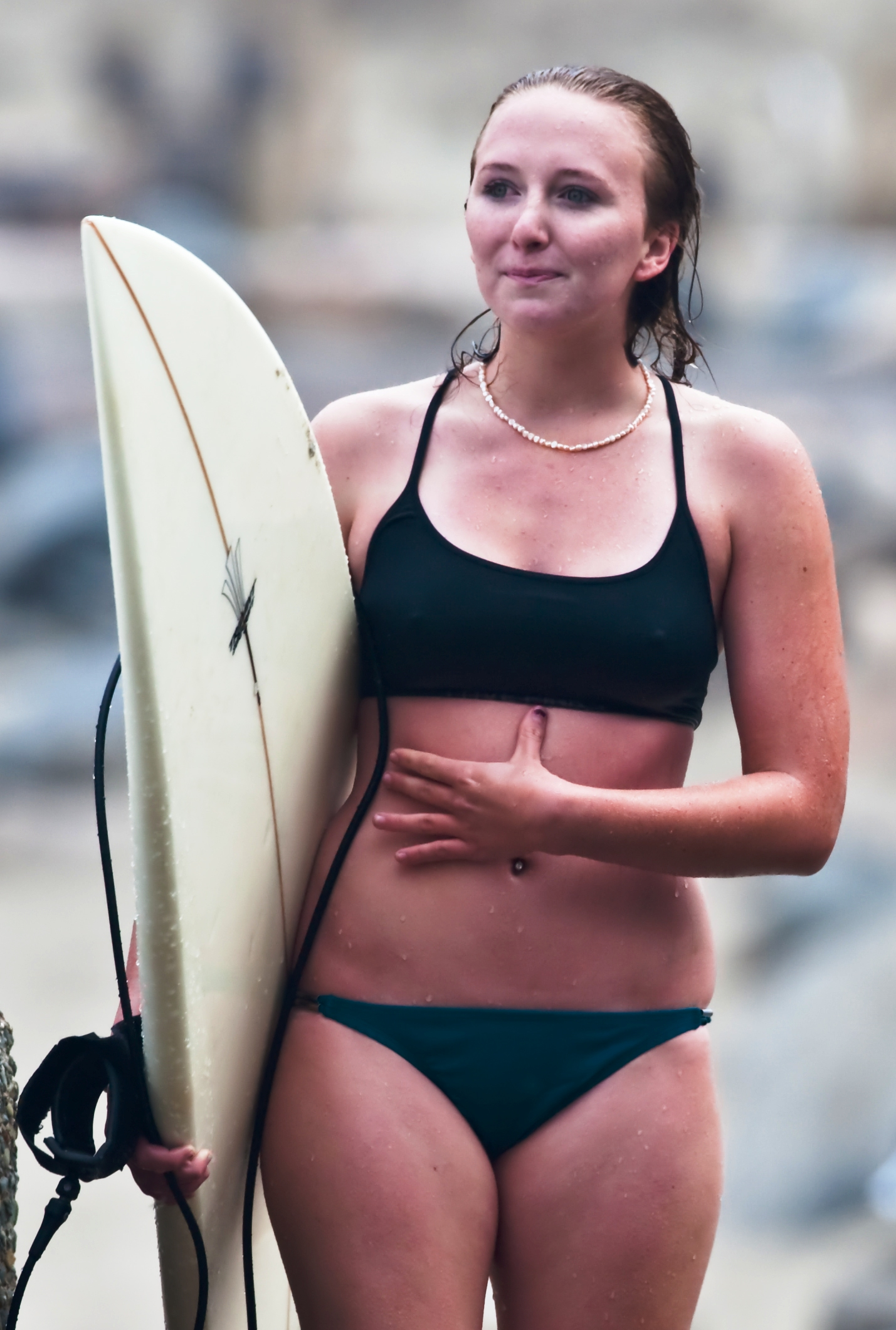
A woman holding her surfboard about to surf in Morro Bay, California

In July 1885, three teenage Hawaiian princes took a break from their boarding school, St. Matthew's Hall in San Mateo, and came to cool off in Santa Cruz, California. There, David Kawānanakoa, Edward Keliʻiahonui and Jonah Kūhiō Kalanianaʻole surfed the mouth of the San Lorenzo River on custom-shaped redwood boards, according to surf historians Kim Stoner and Geoff Dunn. In 1890, the pioneer in agricultural education John Wrightson reputedly became the first British surfer when instructed by two Hawaiian students at his college.

George Freeth (1883–1919), American with English and Native Hawaiian descent, is generally credited as the person who had done more than anyone else to renew interest in surfing at Waikiki in the early twentieth century after the sport had declined in popularity in Hawaii during the latter half of the nineteenth century.

In 1907, the eclectic interests of land developer Abbot Kinney (founder of Venice of America, now Venice, California) helped bring Freeth to California. Freeth had sought the help of the Hawaii Promotion Committee (HPC) in Honolulu to sponsor him on a trip to California to give surfing exhibitions. The HPC arranged through their contacts in Los Angeles to secure a contract for Freeth to perform at Venice of America in July, 1907. Later that year, land baron Henry E. Huntington brought surfing to Redondo Beach. Looking for a way to entice visitors to his own budding resort community south of Venice where he had heavily invested in real estate, he hired Freeth as a lifeguard and to give surfing exhibitions in front of the Hotel Redondo. Another native Hawaiian, Duke Kahanamoku, spread surfing to both the U.S. and Australia, riding the waves after displaying the swimming prowess that won him Olympic gold medals in 1912 and 1920.

Mary Ann Hawkins, inspired by Duke Kahanamoku's surfing during the late 1920s, developed a lifelong passion for surfing. In 1935, her family relocated to Santa Monica, providing her with opportunities to further immerse herself in surfing and paddleboarding. On September 12, 1936, Hawkins achieved a historic milestone by winning California's first women's paddleboard race at the Santa Monica Breakwater. She continued to dominate the sport, winning numerous competitions, including the women's half-mile paddleboard race and the Venice Breakwater event in 1938, which were held on the same day.

Hawkins was also a pioneer in tandem surfing, a discipline that highlights synchronized surfing between two individuals on a single board. She gained further recognition in 1939 when she performed exhibition paddleboarding and tandem surfing displays at various Southern California beaches, inspiring a new generation of women surfers.

In January 1939, Hawkins was appointed head of the women's auxiliary group of the Santa Monica Paddle Club and rose to vice president by January 1940. Her surfing peers frequently lauded her achievements, with "Whitey" Harrison describing her as "the best tandem rider." Throughout her career, Hawkins exemplified grace and athleticism, leaving an indelible mark on the history of women's surfing and paddleboarding.

In 1975, a professional tour started. That year Margo Oberg became the first female professional surfer.

== Surf waves ==
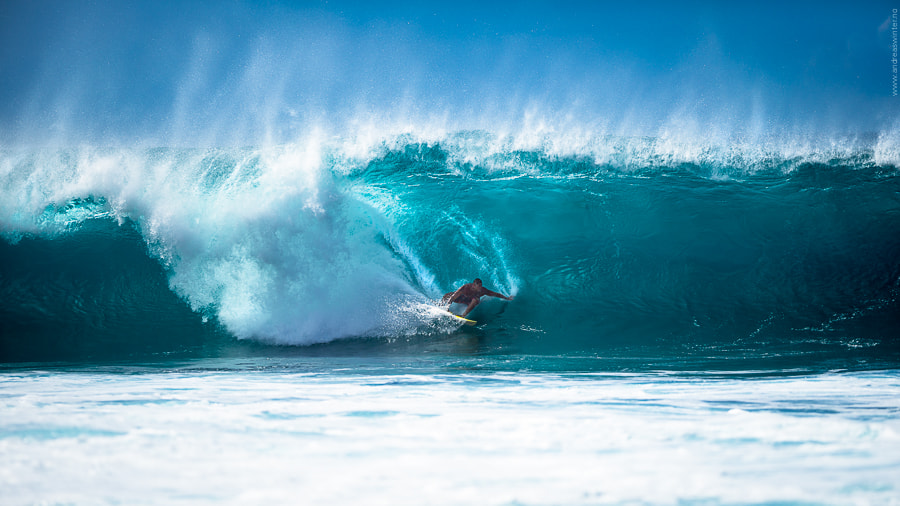
Pipeline barrel at Pūpūkea, Hawaii

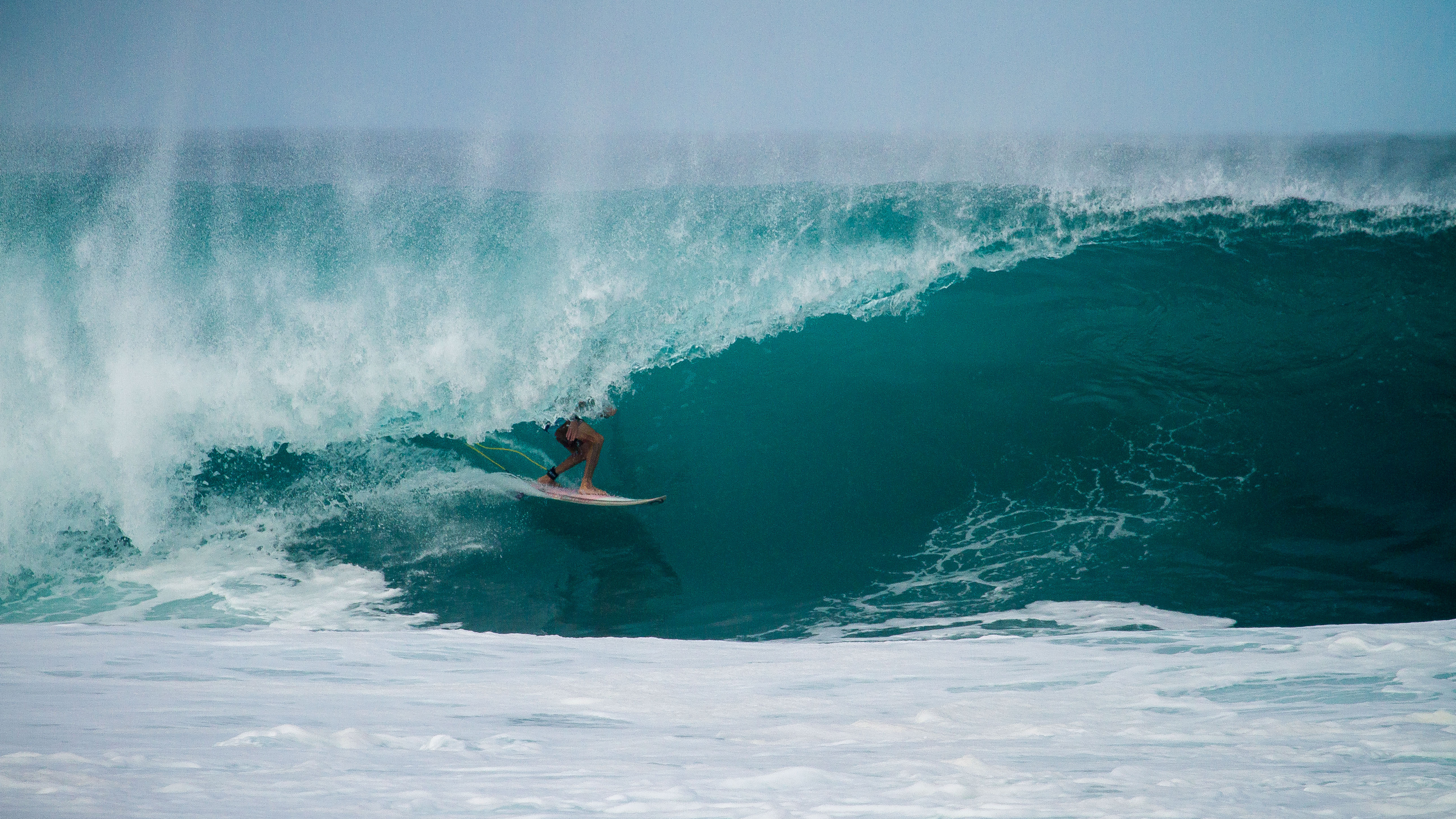
Surfer getting tubed at Sunset on the North Shore of Oahu

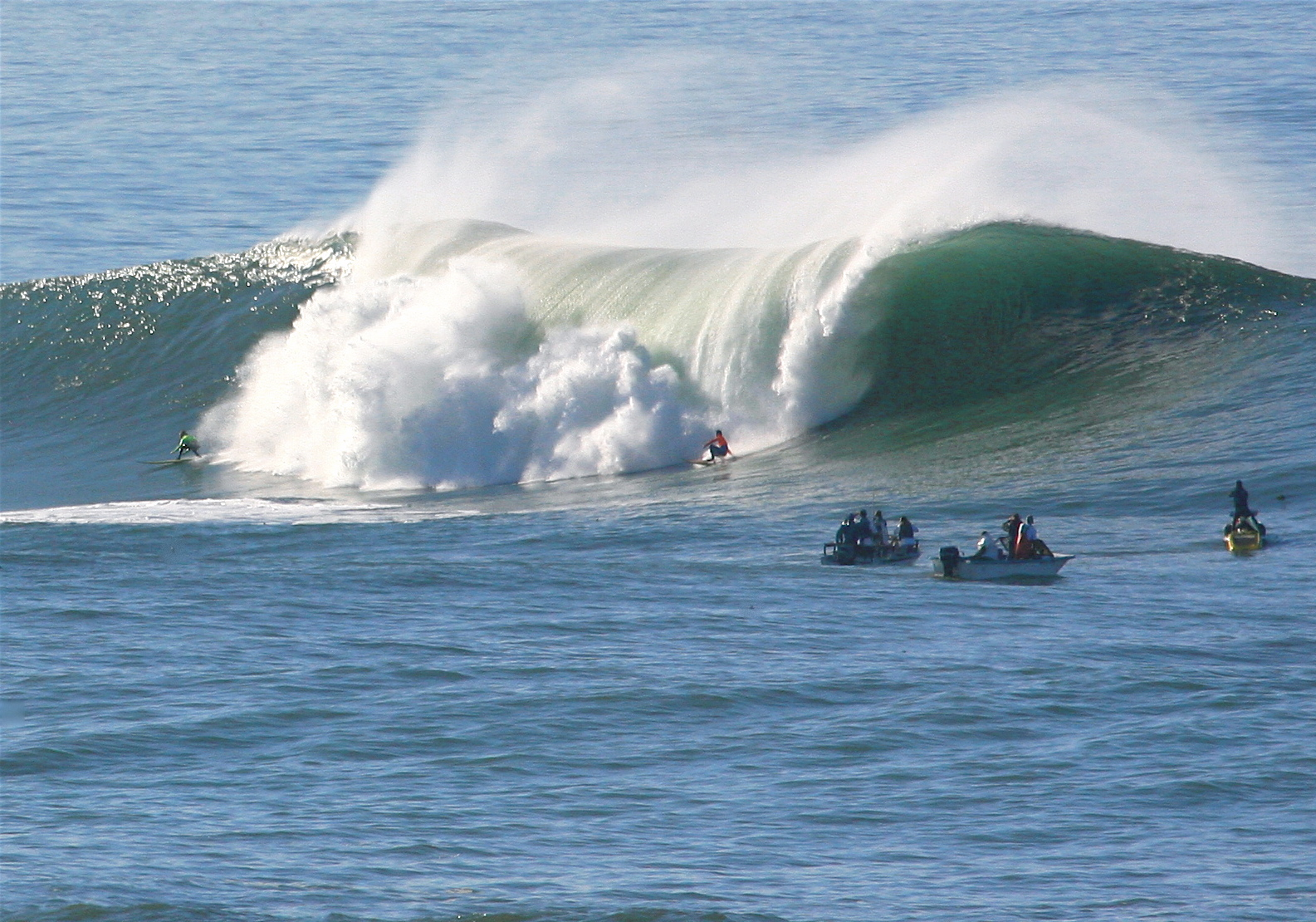
A large wave breaking at Mavericks

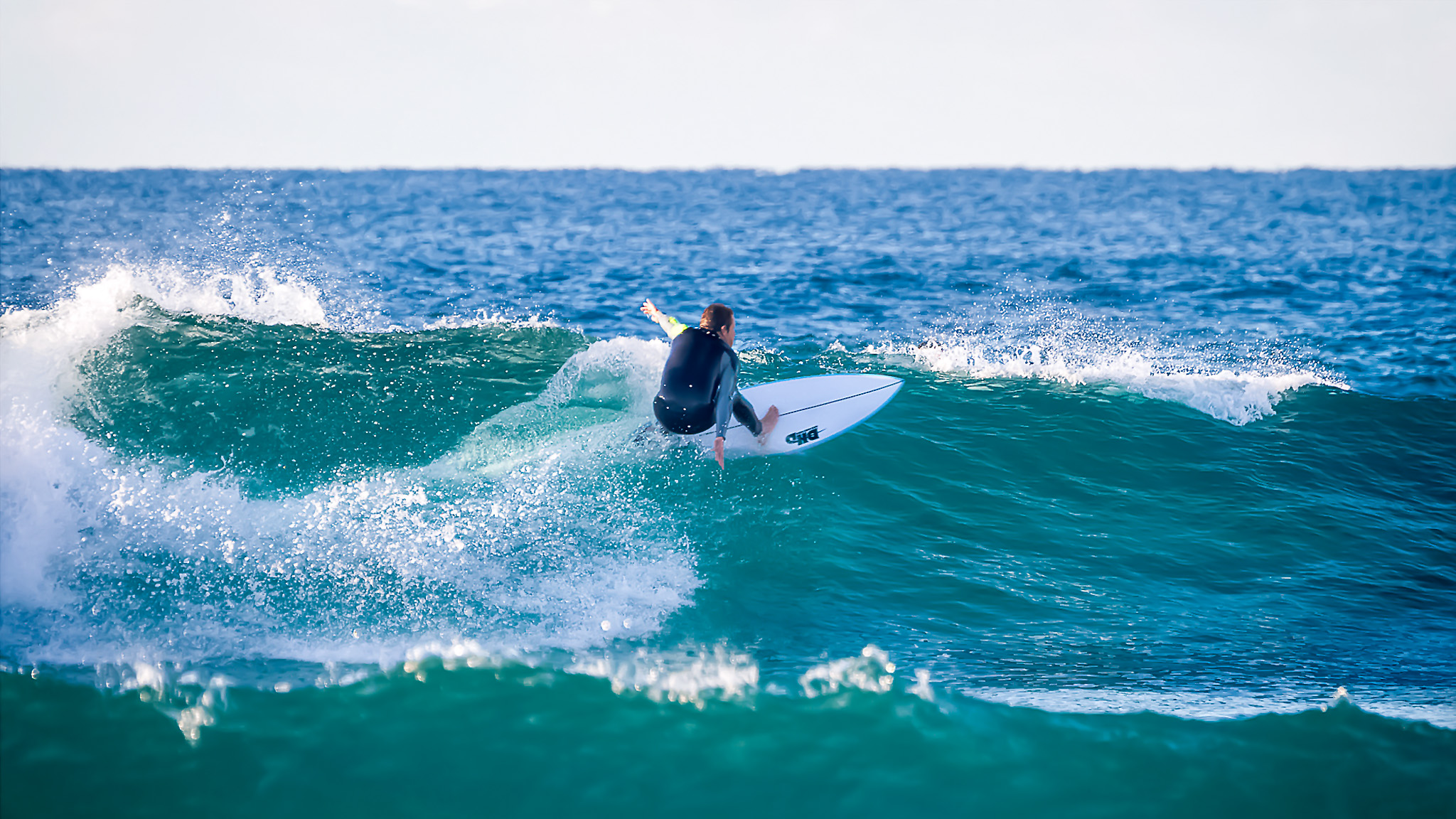
Surfing in winter at Bondi Beach NSW

Swell is generated when the wind blows consistently over a large space of open water, called the wind's fetch. The size of a swell is determined by the strength of the wind, and the length of its fetch and duration. Because of these factors, the surf tends to be larger and more prevalent on coastlines exposed to large expanses of ocean traversed by intense low pressure systems.

Local wind conditions affect wave quality since the surface of a wave can become choppy in blustery conditions. Ideal conditions include a light to moderate "offshore" wind, because it blows into the front of the wave, making it a "barrel" or "tube" wave. Waves are left-handed and right-handed depending upon the breaking formation of the wave.

Waves are generally recognized by the surfaces over which they break. For example, there are beach breaks, reef breaks and point breaks.

The most important influence on wave shape is the topography of the seabed directly behind and immediately beneath the breaking wave. Each break is different since each location's underwater topography is unique. At beach breaks, sandbanks change shape from week to week. Surf forecasting is aided by advances in information technology. Mathematical modeling graphically depicts the size and direction of swells around the globe.

Swell regularity varies across the globe and throughout the year. During winter, heavy swells are generated in the mid-latitudes, when the North and South polar fronts shift toward the Equator. The predominantly Westerly winds generate swells that advance Eastward, so waves tend to be largest on West coasts during winter months. However, an endless train of mid-latitude cyclones cause the isobars to become undulated, redirecting swells at regular intervals toward the tropics.

East coasts also receive heavy winter swells when low-pressure cells form in the sub-tropics, where slow moving highs inhibit their movement. These lows produce a shorter fetch than polar fronts, however, they can still generate heavy swells since their slower movement increases the duration of a particular wind direction. The variables of fetch and duration both influence how long wind acts over a wave as it travels since a wave reaching the end of a fetch behaves as if the wind died.

During summer, heavy swells are generated when cyclones form in the tropics. Tropical cyclones form over warm seas, so their occurrence is influenced by El Niño and La Niña cycles. Their movements are unpredictable.

Surf travel and some surf camps offer surfers access to remote, tropical locations, where tradewinds ensure offshore conditions. Since winter swells are generated by mid-latitude cyclones, their regularity coincides with the passage of these lows. Swells arrive in pulses, each lasting for a couple of days, with a few days between each swell.

The availability of free model data from the NOAA has allowed the creation of several surf forecasting websites.

=== Tube shape and speed ===
The geometry of tube shape can be represented as a ratio between length and width.

Tube shape is defined by length to width ratio. A perfectly cylindrical vortex has a ratio of 1:1. Other forms include:

- Square: <1:1
- Round: 1–2:1
- Almond: >2:1

Peel or peeling off as a descriptive term for the quality of a break has been defined as "a fast, clean, evenly falling curl line, perfect for surfing, and usually found at pointbreaks."

Tube speed is the rate of advance of the break along the length of the wave, and is the speed at which the surfer must move along the wave to keep up with the advance of the tube. Tube speed can be described using the peel angle and wave celerity. Peel angle is the angle between the wave front and the horizontal projection of the point of break over time, which in a regular break is most easily represented by the line of white water left after the break. A break that closes out, or breaks all at once along its length, leaves white water parallel to the wave front, and has a peel angle of 0°. This is unsurfable as it would require infinite speed to progress along the face fast enough to keep up with the break. A break which advances along the wave face more slowly will leave a line of new white water at an angle to the line of the wave face.

$V_s = \frac {c}{sin \alpha}$

Where:

$V_s =$velocity of surfer along the wave face
$c =$wave celerity (velocity in direction of propagation)
$\alpha =$peel angle

In most cases a peel angle less than 25° is too fast to surf.

- Fast: 30°
- Medium: 45°
- Slow: 60°

Wave intensity table
	Fast	Medium	Slow
Square	The Cobra	Teahupoo	Shark Island
Round	Speedies, Gnaraloo	Banzai Pipeline	
Almond	Lagundri Bay, Superbank	Jeffreys Bay, Bells Beach	Angourie Point

=== Wave intensity ===
The type of break depends on shoaling rate. Breaking waves can be classified as four basic types: spilling (ξ_{b}<0.4), plunging (0.4<ξ_{b}<2), collapsing (ξ_{b}>2) and surging (ξ_{b}>2), and which type occurs depends on the slope of the bottom.

Waves suitable for surfing break as spilling or plunging types, and when they also have a suitable peel angle, their value for surfing is enhanced. Other factors such as wave height and period, and wind strength and direction can also influence steepness and intensity of the break, but the major influence on the type and shape of breaking waves is determined by the slope of the seabed before the break. The breaker type index and Iribarren number allow classification of breaker type as a function of wave steepness and seabed slope.

=== Artificial reefs ===
The value of good surf in attracting surf tourism has prompted the construction of artificial reefs and sand bars. Artificial surfing reefs can be built with durable sandbags or concrete, and resemble a submerged breakwater. These artificial reefs not only provide a surfing location, but also dissipate wave energy and shelter the coastline from erosion. Ships such as Seli 1 that have accidentally stranded on sandy bottoms, can create sandbanks that give rise to good waves.

An artificial reef known as Chevron Reef was constructed in El Segundo, California in hopes of creating a new surfing area. However, the reef failed to produce any quality waves and was removed in 2008. In Kovalam, South West India, an artificial reef has successfully provided the local community with a quality lefthander, stabilized coastal soil erosion, and provided good habitat for marine life. ASR Ltd., a New Zealand-based company, constructed the Kovalam reef and was working on another reef in Boscombe, England.

=== Artificial waves ===
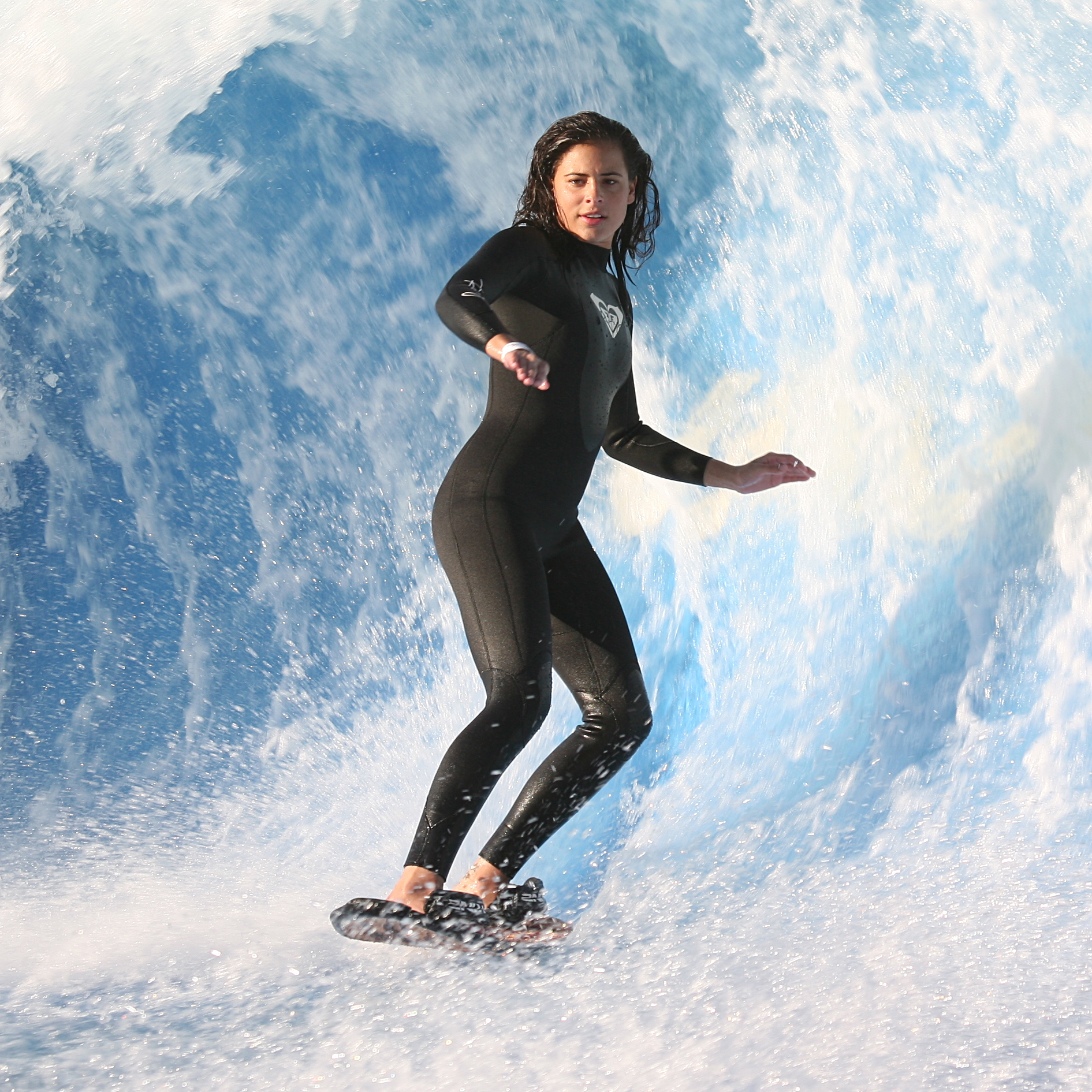
Surfing a stationary, artificial wave in Southern California

Even with artificial reefs in place, a tourist's vacation time may coincide with a "flat spell", when no waves are available. Completely artificial wave pools aim to solve that problem by controlling all the elements that go into creating perfect surf, however there are only a handful of wave pools that can simulate good surfing waves, owing primarily to construction and operation costs and potential liability. Most wave pools generate waves that are too small and lack the power necessary to surf. The Seagaia Ocean Dome, located in Miyazaki, Japan, was an example of a surfable wave pool. Able to generate waves with up to 3 m (10 ft) faces, the specialized pump held water in 20 vertical tanks positioned along the back edge of the pool. This allowed the waves to be directed as they approach the artificial sea floor. Lefts, Rights, and A-frames could be directed from this pump design providing for rippable surf and barrel rides. The Ocean Dome cost about $2 billion to build and was expensive to maintain. The Ocean Dome was closed in 2007. In England, construction is nearing completion on the Wave, situated near Bristol, which will enable people unable to get to the coast to enjoy the waves in a controlled environment, set in the heart of nature.

There are two main types of artificial waves that exist today. One type are the artificial or stationary waves which simulate a moving, breaking wave by pumping a layer of water against a smooth structure mimicking the shape of a breaking wave. Because of the velocity of the rushing water, the wave and the surfer can remain stationary while the water rushes by under the surfboard. Artificial waves of this kind provide the opportunity to try surfing and learn its basics in a moderately small and controlled environment near or far from locations with natural surf.

== Maneuvers ==
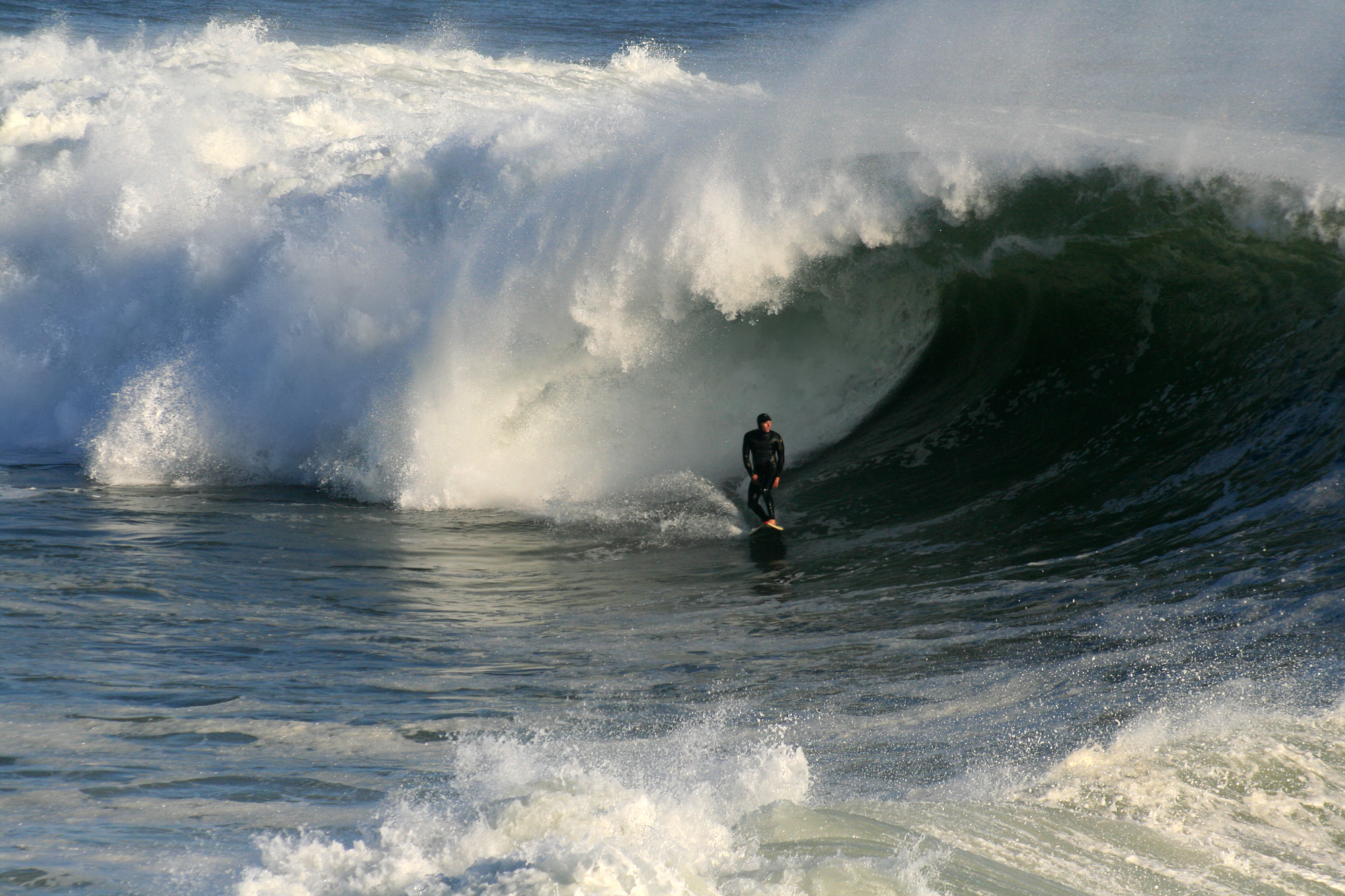
A surfer going for the tube

Catching waves at a surfing contest on the North Shore of Oahu, Hawaii

Aerial views of a surfing competition at Salt Creek Beach, Dana Point, California.

Standup surfing begins when the surfer paddles toward shore in an attempt to match the speed of the wave (the same applies whether the surfer is standup paddling, bodysurfing, boogie-boarding or using some other type of watercraft, such as a waveski or kayak). Once the wave begins to carry the surfer forward, the surfer stands up and proceeds to ride the wave. The basic idea is to position the surfboard so it is just ahead of the breaking part (whitewash) of the wave, in the so-called 'pocket'. It is difficult for beginners to catch the wave at all.

Surfers' skills are tested by their ability to control their board in difficult conditions, riding challenging waves, and executing maneuvers such as strong turns and cutbacks (turning board back to the breaking wave) and carving (a series of strong back-to-back maneuvers). More advanced skills include the floater (riding on top of the breaking curl of the wave), and off the lip (banking off crest of the breaking wave). A newer addition to surfing is the progression of the air, whereby a surfer propels off the wave entirely up into the air and then successfully lands the board back on the wave.

The tube ride is considered to be the ultimate maneuver in surfing. As a wave breaks, if the conditions are ideal, the wave will break in an orderly line from the middle to the shoulder, enabling the experienced surfer to position themselves inside the wave as it is breaking. This is known as a tube ride. Viewed from the shore, the tube rider may disappear from view as the wave breaks over the rider's head. The longer the surfer remains in the tube, the more successful the ride. This is referred to as getting tubed, barrelled, shacked or pitted. Some of the world's best-known waves for tube riding include Pipeline on the North Shore of Oahu, Teahupoo in Tahiti and G-Land in Java. Other names for the tube include "the barrel", and "the pit".

Hanging ten and hanging five are moves usually specific to longboarding. Hanging Ten refers to having both feet on the front end of the board with all of the surfer's toes off the edge, also known as nose-riding. Hanging Five is having just one foot near the front, with five toes off the edge.

Cutback: Generating speed down the line and then turning back to reverse direction.

Snap: Quickly turning along the face or top of the wave, almost as if snapping the board back towards the wave. Typically done on steeper waves.

Blowtail: Pushing the tail of the board out of the back of the wave so that the fins leave the water.

Floater: Suspending the board atop the wave. Very popular on small waves.

Top-Turn: Turn off the top of the wave. Sometimes used to generate speed and sometimes to shoot spray.

Bottom Turn: A turn at the bottom or mid-face of the wave, this maneuver is used to set up other maneuvers such as the top turn, cutback and even aerials.

Airs/Aerials: These maneuvers have been becoming more and more prevalent in the sport in both competition and free surfing. An air is when the surfer can achieve enough speed and approach a certain type of section of a wave that is supposed to act as a ramp and launch the surfer above the lip line of the wave, "catching air", and landing either in the transition of the wave or the whitewash when hitting a close-out section.

Airs can either be straight airs or rotational airs. Straight airs have minimal rotation if any, but definitely no more rotation than 90 degrees. Rotational airs require a rotation of 90 degrees or more depending on the level of the surfer.

Types of rotations:

- 180 degrees – called an air reverse, this is when the surfer spins enough to land backwards, then reverts to their original positional with the help of the fins. This rotation can either be done frontside or backside and can spin right or left.
- 360 degrees – this is a full rotation air or "full rotor" where the surfer lands where they started or more, as long as they do not land backwards. When this is achieved front side on a wave spinning the opposite of an air reverse is called an alley-oop.
- 540 degrees – the surfer does a full rotation plus another 180 degrees and can be inverted or spinning straight, few surfers have been able to land this air.
- Backflip – usually done with a double grab, this hard to land air is made for elite-level surfers.
- Rodeo flip – usually done backside, it is a backflip with a 180 rotation, and is actually easier than a straight backflip.
- Grabs – a surfer can help land an aerial maneuver by grabbing the surfboard, keeping them attached to the board and keeping the board under their feet. Common types of grabs include:
  - Indy – a grab on the surfers inside rail going frontside, outside rail going backside with their backhand.
  - Slob – a grab on the surfers inside rail going frontside, outside rail going backside with their front hand.
  - Lien – A grab on the surfers outside rail frontside, inside rail going backside with their front hand.
  - Stalefish – A grab on the surfers outside rail frontside, inside rail backside with their backhand.
  - Double grab – A grab on the surfers inside and outside rail, the inside rail with the backhand and the outside rail with the front hand.

=== Terms ===
The Glossary of surfing includes some of the extensive vocabulary used to describe various aspects of the sport of surfing as described in literature on the subject. In some cases terms have spread to a wider cultural use. These terms were originally coined by people who were directly involved in the sport of surfing.

== Learning ==
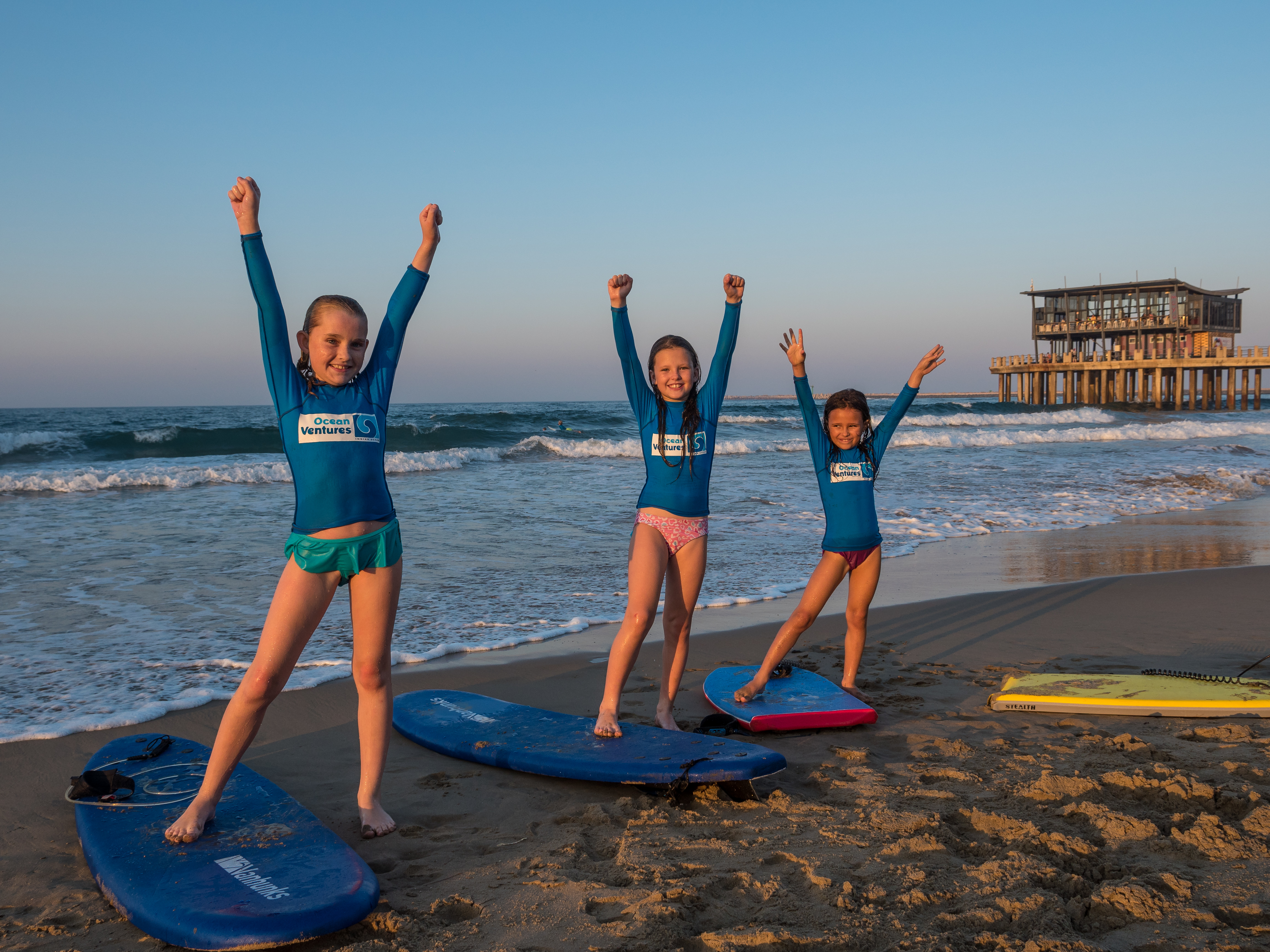

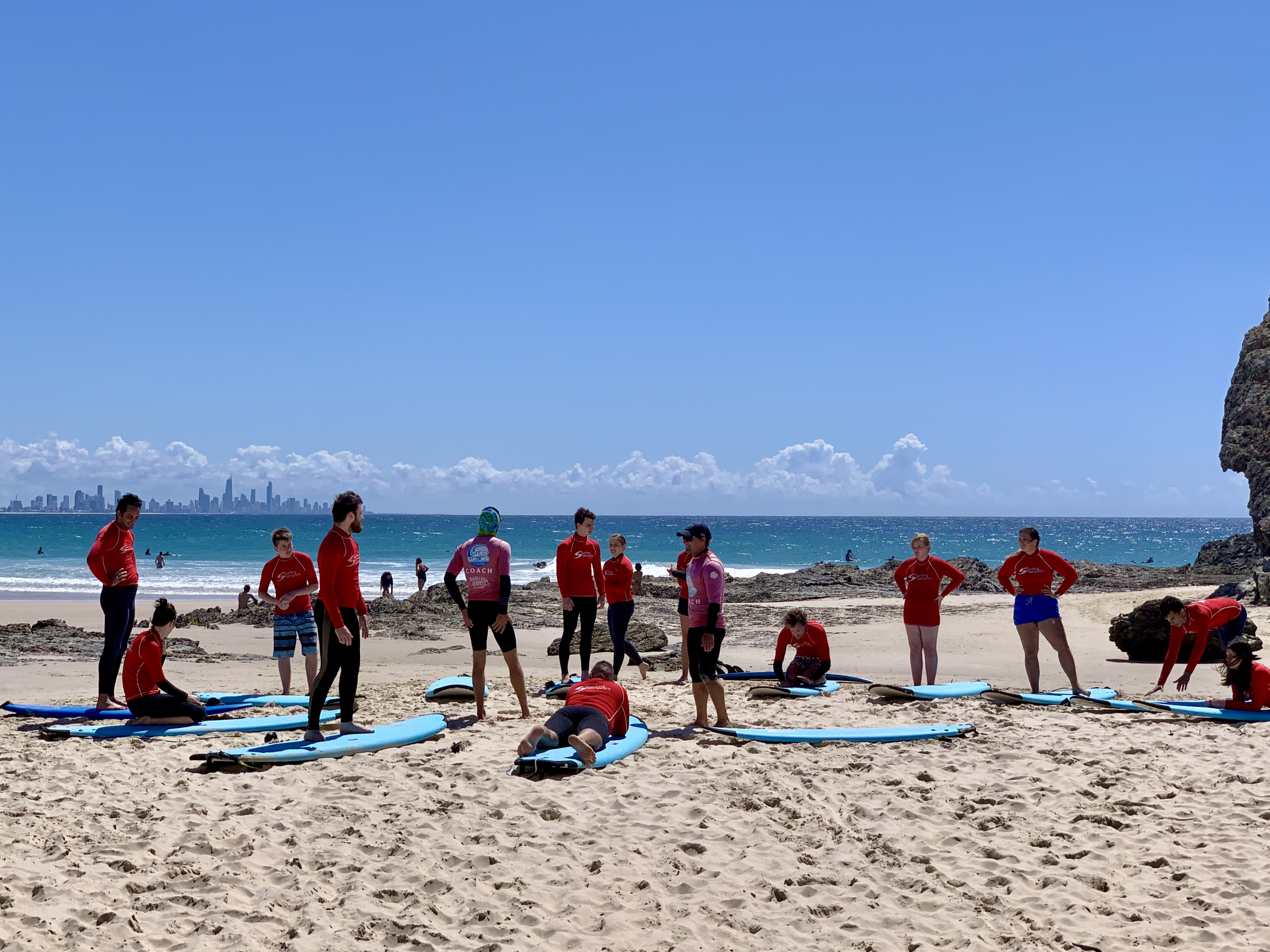
Learning to surf

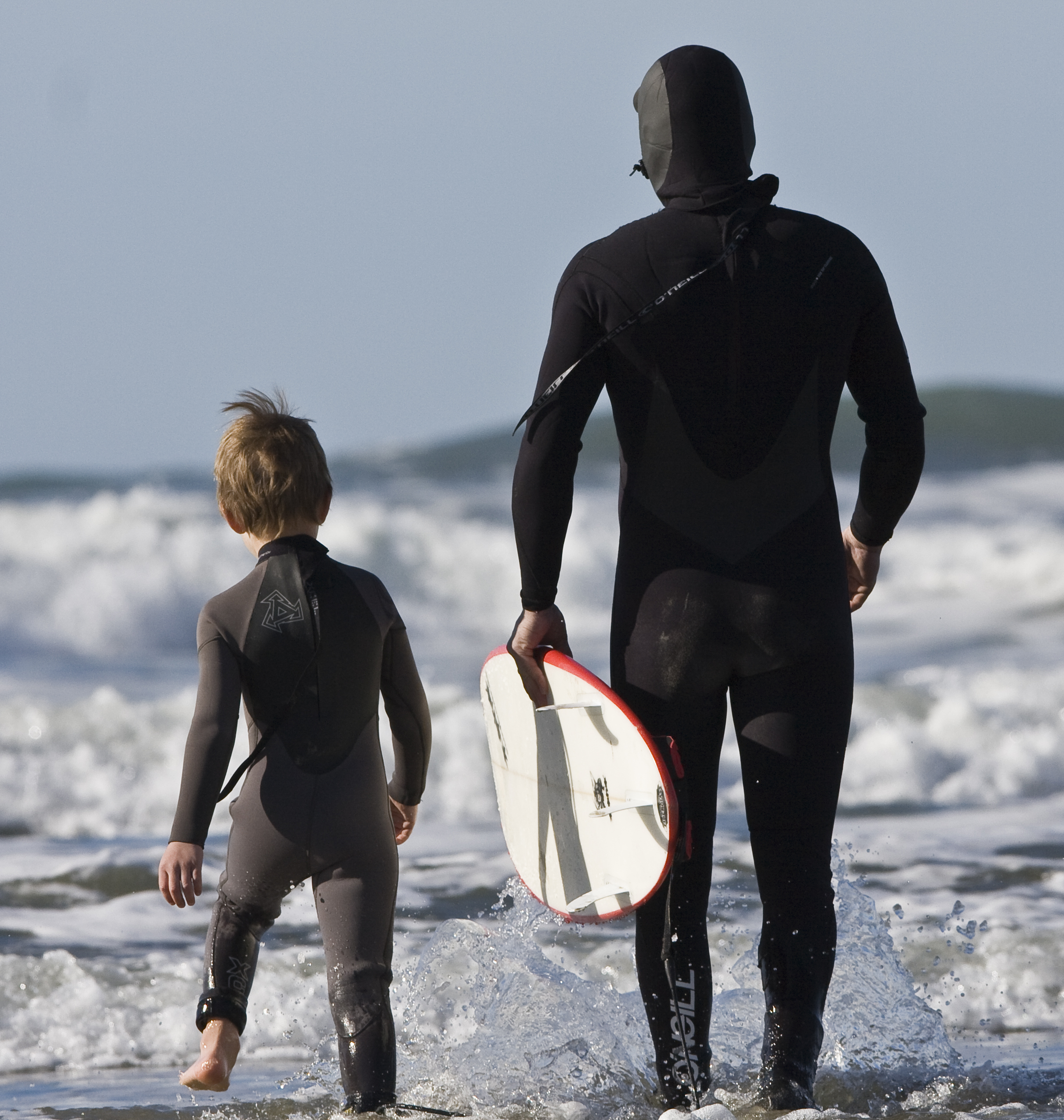
Father & son. Surfing can be a family hobby.

Many popular surfing destinations have surf schools and surf camps that offer lessons. Surf camps for beginners and intermediates are multi-day lessons that focus on surfing fundamentals. They are designed to take new surfers and help them become proficient riders. All-inclusive surf camps offer overnight accommodations, meals, lessons and surfboards. Most surf lessons begin with instruction and a safety briefing on land, followed by instructors helping students into waves on longboards or "softboards". The softboard is considered the ideal surfboard for learning, due to the fact it is safer, and has more paddling speed and stability than shorter boards. Funboards are also a popular shape for beginners as they combine the volume and stability of the longboard with the manageable size of a smaller surfboard. New and inexperienced surfers typically learn to catch waves on softboards around the 210 to 240 cm (7 to 8 ft) funboard size. Due to the softness of the surfboard the chance of getting injured is substantially minimized.

It is possible to learn to surf without an instructor, but the process is usually safer and quicker with a surf instructor. Typical surfing instruction is best-performed one-on-one, but can also be done in a group setting. Post-COVID, there has been a shift towards online and land-based surf coaching and training. Online surf coaching is allowing surfers to learn at their own pace and convenience from anywhere. Land-based training, such as skateboard simulations, offers a way to practice maneuvers repeatedly, refining techniques with the guidance of professional coaches either in person or remotely using video analysis apps. The most popular surf locations offer perfect surfing conditions for beginners, as well as challenging breaks for advanced students. The ideal conditions for learning would be small waves that crumble and break softly, as opposed to the steep, fast-peeling waves desired by more experienced surfers. When available, a sandy seabed is generally safer.

Surfing can be broken into several skills: paddling strength, positioning to catch the wave, timing, and balance. Paddling out requires strength, but also the mastery of techniques to break through oncoming waves (duck diving, eskimo roll also known as turtle roll). Take-off positioning requires experience at predicting the wave set and where it will break. The surfer must pop up quickly as soon as the wave starts pushing the board forward. Preferred positioning on the wave is determined by experience at reading wave features including where the wave is breaking. Balance plays a crucial role in standing on a surfboard. Thus, balance training exercises are good preparation. Practicing with a balance board, longboard (skateboard), surfskate or swing board helps novices master the art of surfing.

The repetitive cycle of paddling, popping up, and balancing requires stamina and physical strength. Having a proper warm-up routine can help prevent injuries.

== Equipment ==
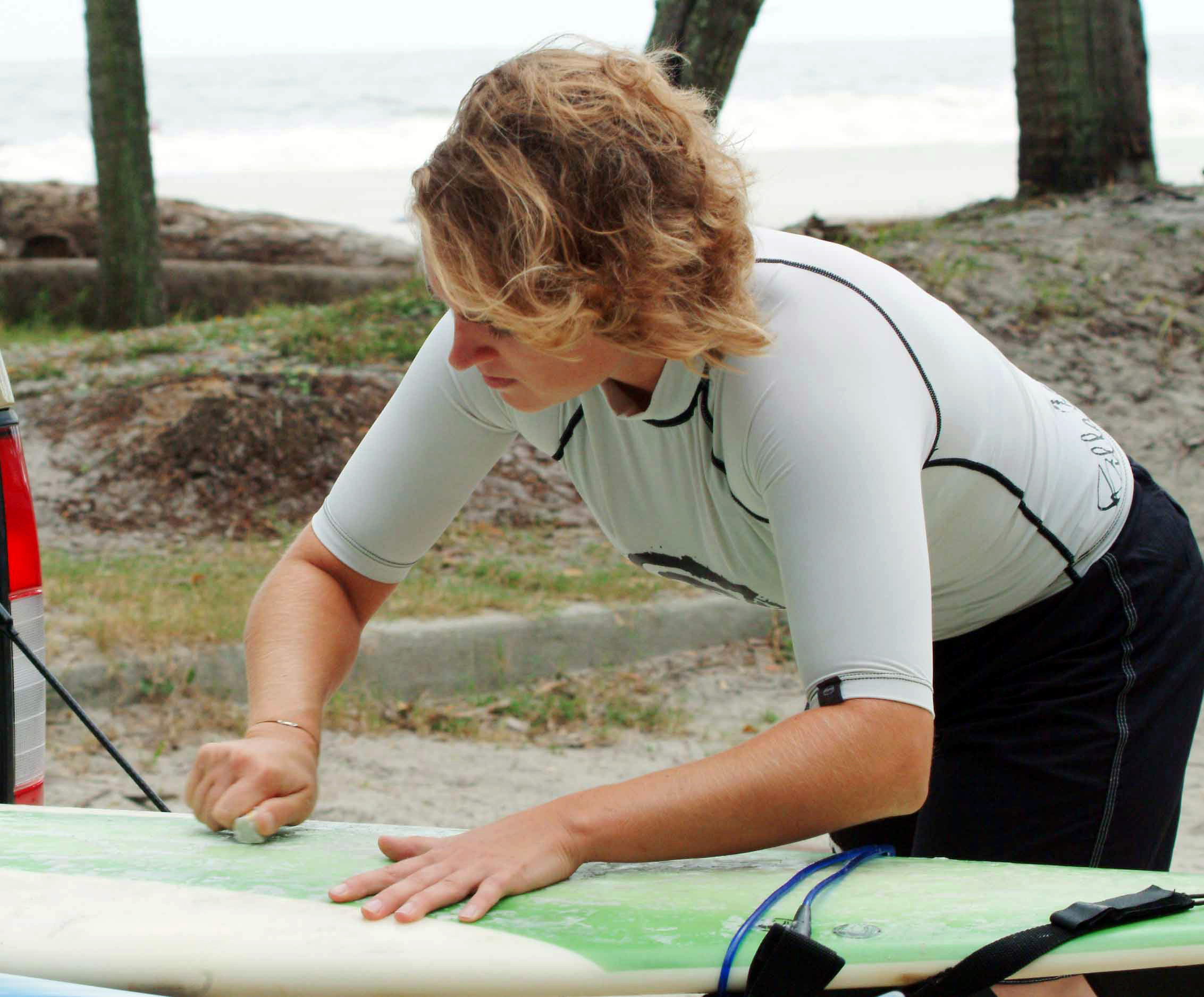
Waxing a surfboard

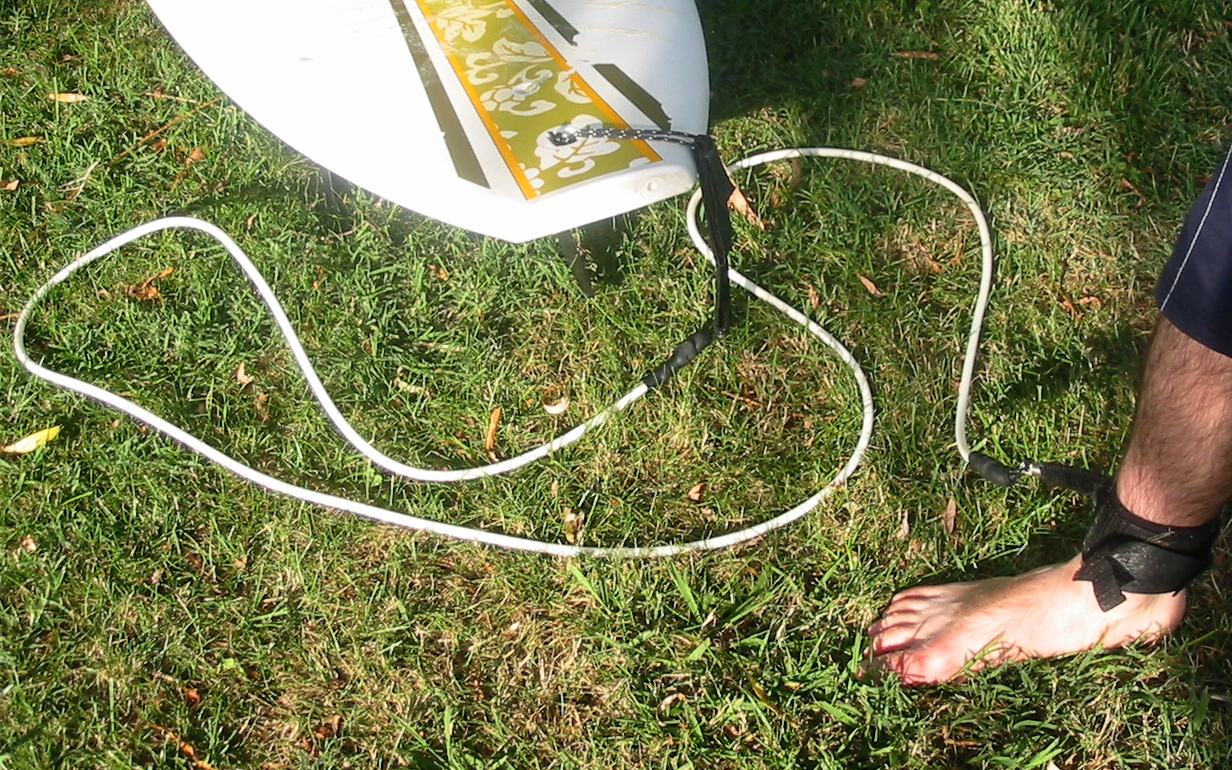
Surfboard leash

Surfing can be done on various equipment, including surfboards, longboards, stand up paddle boards (SUPs), bodyboards, wave skis, skimboards, kneeboards, surf mats and macca's trays. Surfboards were originally made of solid wood and were large and heavy (often up to 370 cm (12 ft) long and having a mass of 70 kg (150 lb)). Lighter balsa wood surfboards (first made in the late 1940s and early 1950s) were a significant improvement, not only in portability, but also in increasing maneuverability.

Most modern surfboards are made of fiberglass foam (PU), with one or more wooden strips or "stringers", fiberglass cloth, and polyester resin (PE). An emerging board material is epoxy resin and Expanded Polystyrene foam (EPS) which is stronger and lighter than traditional PU/PE construction. Even newer designs incorporate materials such as carbon fiber and variable-flex composites in conjunction with fiberglass and epoxy or polyester resins. Since epoxy/EPS surfboards are generally lighter, they will float better than a traditional PU/PE board of similar size, shape and thickness. This makes them easier to paddle and faster in the water. However, a common complaint of EPS boards is that they do not provide as much feedback as a traditional PU/PE board. For this reason, many advanced surfers prefer that their surfboards be made from traditional materials.

Other equipment includes a leash (to stop the board from drifting away after a wipeout and to prevent it from hitting other surfers), surf wax, traction pads (to keep a surfer's feet from slipping off the deck of the board), and fins (also known as skegs) which can either be permanently attached (glassed-on) or interchangeable. Sportswear designed or particularly suitable for surfing may be sold as boardwear (the term is also used in snowboarding). In warmer climates, swimsuits, surf trunks or boardshorts are worn, and occasionally rash guards; in cold water, surfers can opt to wear wetsuits, boots, hoods, and gloves to protect them against lower water temperatures. A newer introduction is a rash vest with a thin layer of titanium to provide maximum warmth without compromising mobility. In recent years, there have been advancements in technology that have allowed surfers to pursue even bigger waves with added elements of safety. Big wave surfers are now experimenting with inflatable vests or colored dye packs to help decrease their odds of drowning.

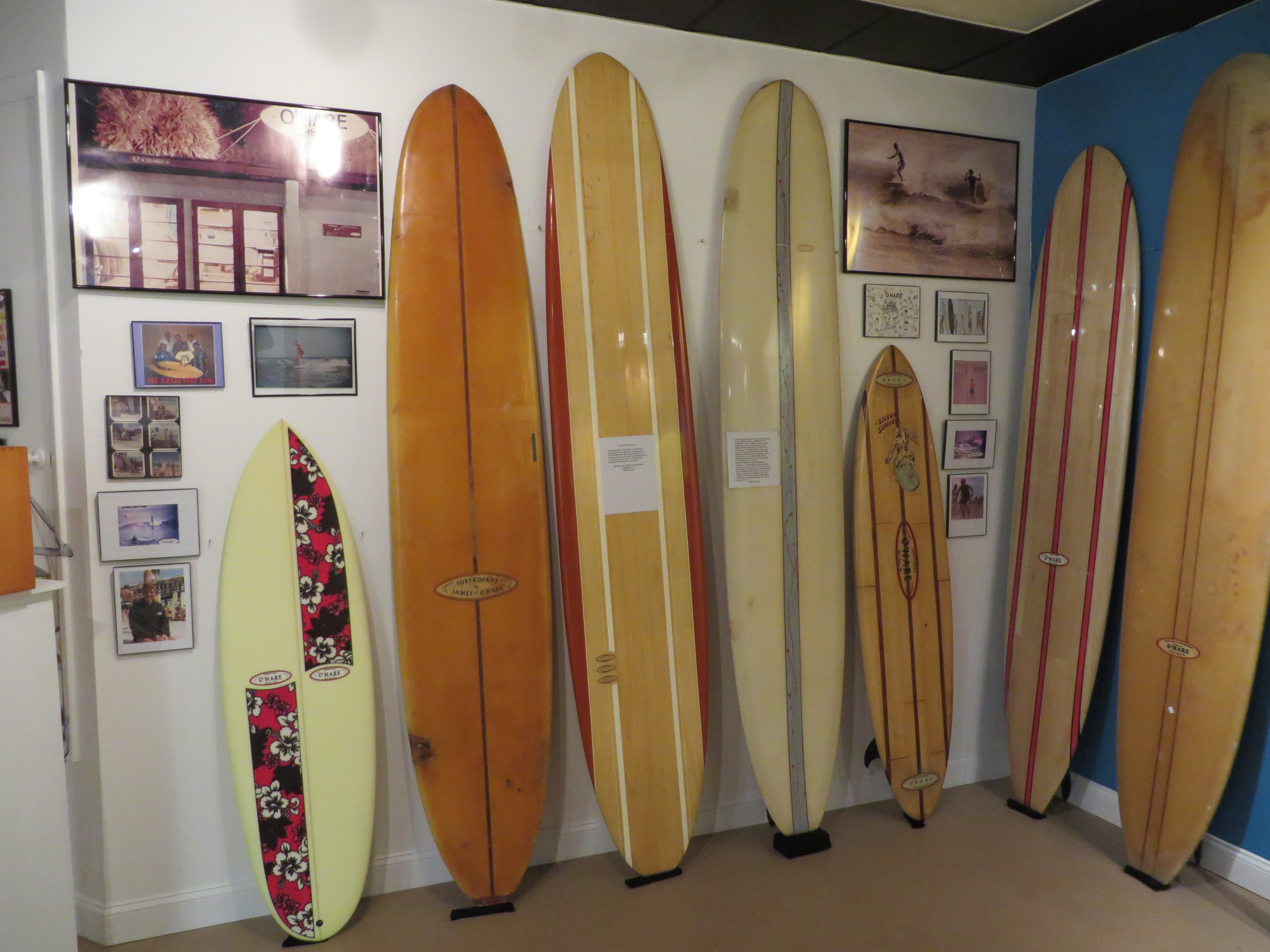
A variety of surfboards

There are many different surfboard sizes, shapes, and designs in use today. Modern longboards, generally 270 to 300 cm (9 to 10 ft) in length, are reminiscent of the earliest surfboards, but now benefit from modern innovations in surfboard shaping and fin design. Competitive longboard surfers need to be competent at traditional walking manoeuvres, as well as the short-radius turns normally associated with shortboard surfing. The modern shortboard began life in the late 1960s and has evolved into today's common thruster style, defined by its three fins, usually around 180 to 210 cm (6 to 7 ft) in length. The thruster was invented by Australian shaper Simon Anderson.

Midsize boards, often called funboards, provide more maneuverability than a longboard, with more flotation than a shortboard. While many surfers find that funboards live up to their name, providing the best of both surfing modes, others are critical.

"It is the happy medium of mediocrity," writes Steven Kotler. "Funboard riders either have nothing left to prove or lack the skills to prove anything."

There are also various niche styles, such as the Egg, a longboard-style short board targeted at people who want to ride a shortboard but need more paddle power. The Fish, a board that is typically shorter, flatter, and wider than a normal shortboard, often with a split tail (known as a swallow tail). The Fish often has two or four fins and is specifically designed for surfing smaller waves. For big waves, there is the Gun, a long, thick board with a pointed nose and tail (known as a pintail) specifically designed for big waves.

== The physics of surfing ==
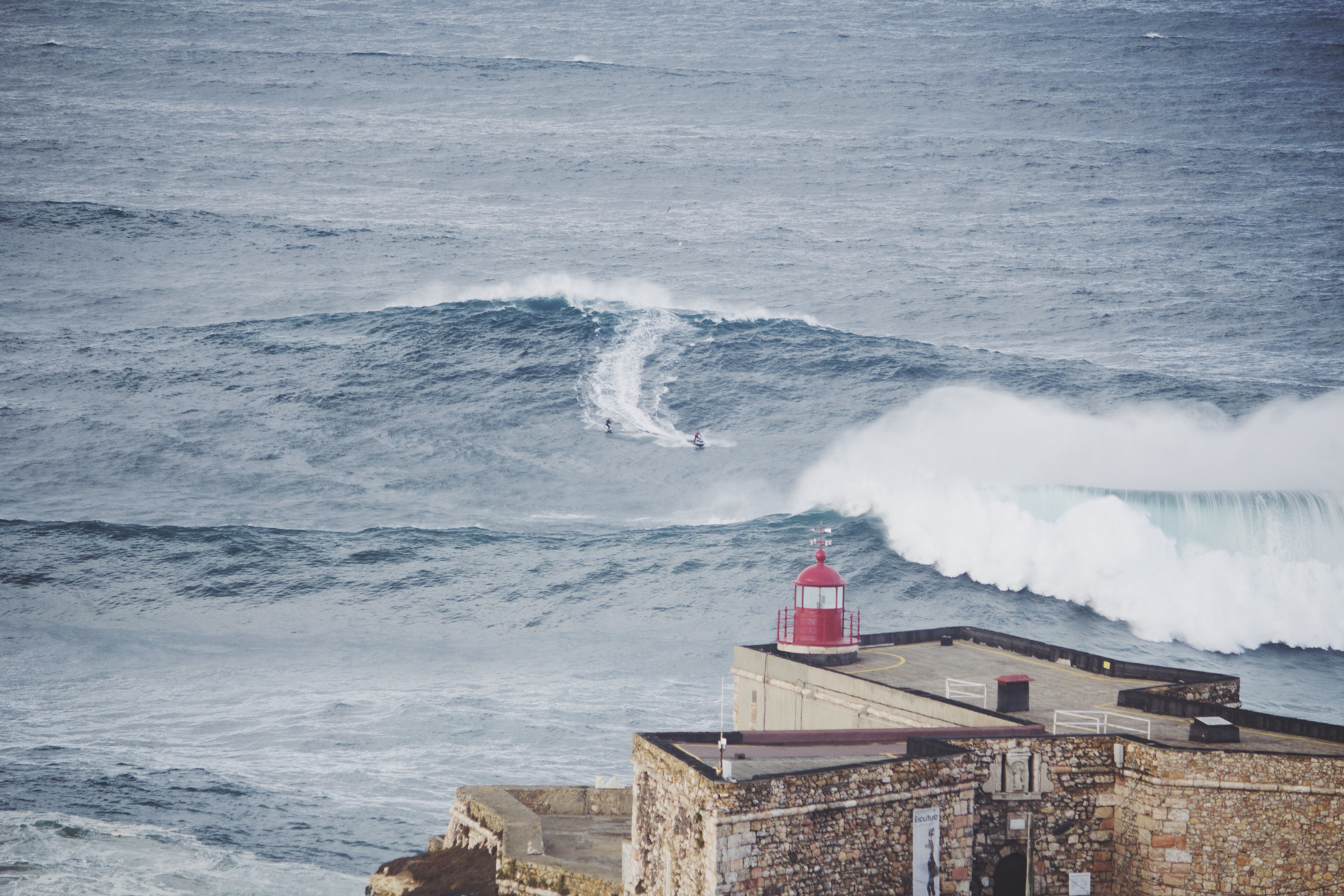
Tow-in surfing in Nazaré, Portugal

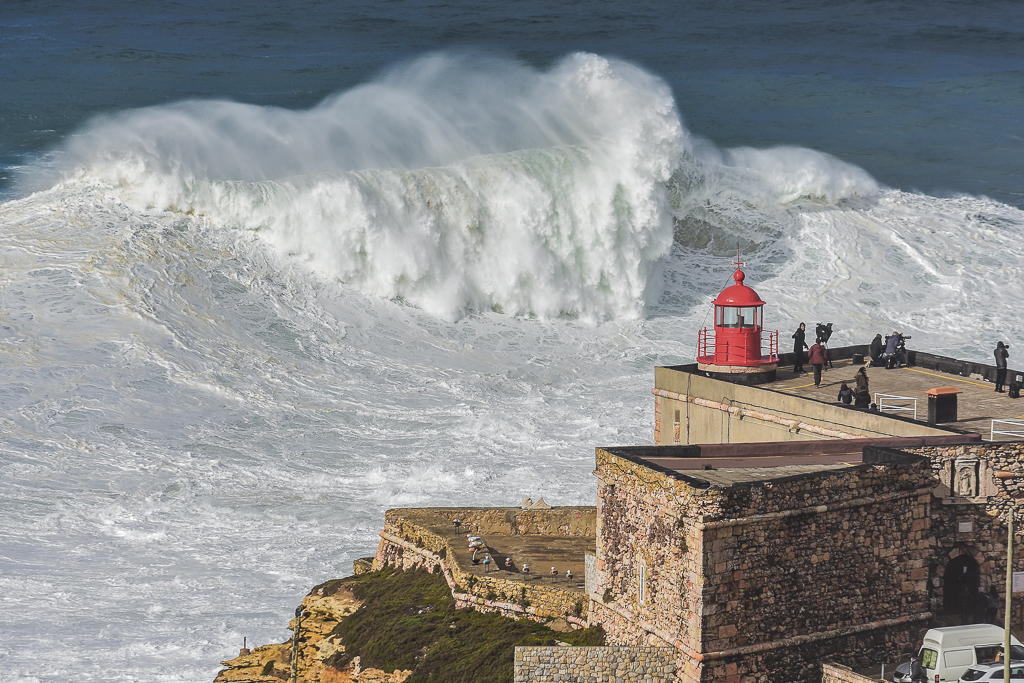
Giant breaking waves in Praia do Norte

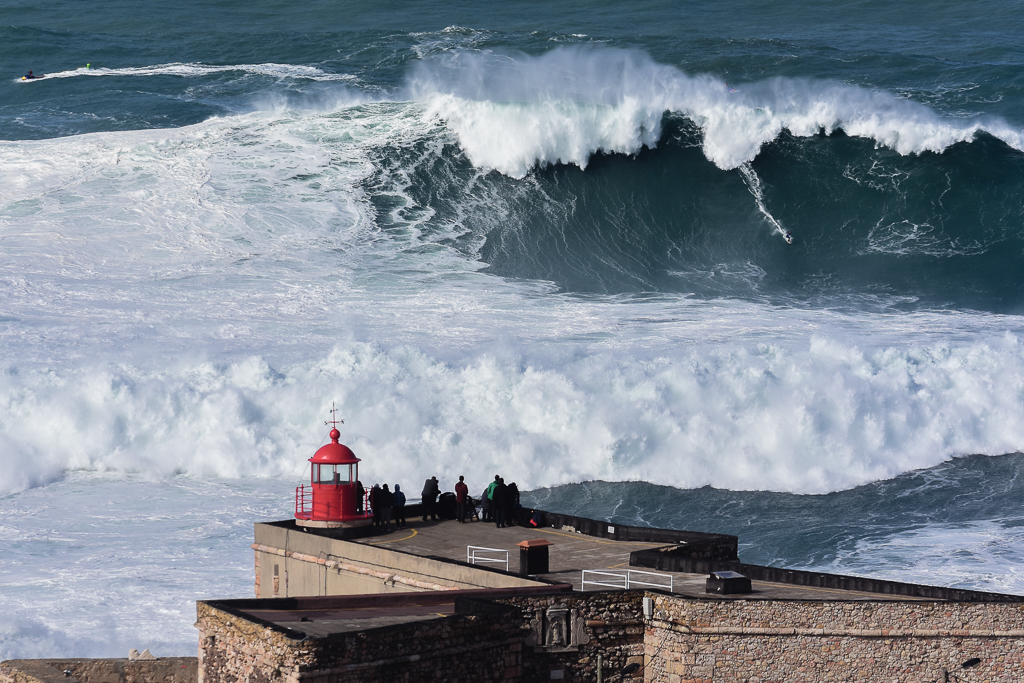
The Praia do Norte, Nazaré (North Beach) was listed in the Guinness World Records for the biggest waves ever surfed.

The physics of surfing involves the physical oceanographic properties of wave creation in the surf zone, the characteristics of the surfboard, and the surfer's interaction with the water and the board.

=== Wave formation ===
Ocean waves are defined as a collection of dislocated water parcels that undergo a cycle of being forced past their normal position and being restored back to their normal position. Wind causes ripples and eddies to form waves that gradually gain speed and distance (fetch). Waves increase in energy and speed and then become longer and stronger. The fully-developed sea has the strongest wave action that experiences storms lasting 10-hours and creates 15 m (49.2 ft) wave heights in the open ocean.

The waves created in the open ocean are classified as deep-water waves. Deep-water waves have no bottom interaction and the orbits of these water molecules are circular; their wavelength is short relative to water depth and the velocity decays before reaching the bottom of the water basin. Deep water waves are waves in water depths greater than half their wavelengths. Wind forces waves to break in the deep sea.

Deep-water waves travel to shore and become shallow-water waves when the water depth is less than half of their wavelength, and the wave motion becomes constrained by the bottom, causing the orbit paths to be flattened to ellipses. The bottom exerts a frictional drag on the bottom of the wave, which decreases the celerity (or the speed of the waveform), and causes refraction. Slowing the wave forces it to shorten which increases the height and steepness, and the top (crest) falls because the velocity of the top of the wave becomes greater than the velocity of the bottom of the wave where the drag occurs.

The surf zone is the place of convergence of multiple waves types creating complex wave patterns. A wave suitable for surfing results from maximum speeds of 5 metres per second (16 ft/s). This speed is relative because local onshore winds can cause waves to break. In the surf zone, shallow water waves are carried by global winds to the beach and interact with local winds to make surfing waves.

Different onshore and off-shore wind patterns in the surf zone create different types of waves. Onshore winds cause random wave breaking patterns and are more suitable for experienced surfers. Light offshore winds create smoother waves, while strong direct offshore winds cause plunging or large barrel waves. Barrel waves are large because the water depth is small when the wave breaks. Thus, the breaker intensity (or force) increases, and the wave speed and height increase. Off-shore winds produce non-surfable conditions by flattening a weak swell. Weak swell is made from surface gravity forces and has long wavelengths.

=== Wave conditions for surfing ===
Surfing waves can be analyzed using the following parameters: breaking wave height, wave peel angle (α), wave breaking intensity, and wave section length. The breaking wave height has two measurements, the relative heights estimated by surfers and the exact measurements done by physical oceanographers. Measurements done by surfers were 1.36 to 2.58 times higher than the measurements done by scientists. The scientifically concluded wave heights that are physically possible to surf are 1 to 20 m (3.3 to 66 ft).

The wave peel angle is one of the main constituents of a potential surfing wave. Wave peel angle measures the distance between the peel-line and the line tangent to the breaking crest line. This angle controls the speed of the wave crest. The speed of the wave is an addition of the propagation velocity vector (Vw) and peel velocity vector (Vp), which results in the overall velocity of the wave (Vs).

Wave breaking intensity measures the force of the wave as it breaks, spills, or plunges (a plunging wave is termed by surfers as a "barrel wave"). Wave section length is the distance between two breaking crests in a wave set. Wave section length can be hard to measure because local winds, non-linear wave interactions, island sheltering, and swell interactions can cause multifarious wave configurations in the surf zone.

The parameters breaking wave height, wave peel angle (α), and wave breaking intensity, and wave section length are important because they are standardized by past oceanographers who researched surfing; these parameters have been used to create a guide that matches the type of wave formed and the skill level of surfer.

Table 1: Wave type and surfer skill level
Skill level	Peel angle (degrees)	Wave height (meters)	Section speed (meters/second)	Section length (meters)	General locations of waves
Beginner	60-70	2.5	10	25	Low Gradient Breaks; Atlantic Beach, Florida
Intermediate	55	2.5	20	40	Bells Beach; Australia
Competent	40-50	3	20	40-60	Kirra Point; Burleigh Heads
Top Amateur	30	3	20	60	Bingin Beach; Padang Padang Beach
Top World Surfer	>27	3	20	60	Banzai Pipeline; Shark Island

Table 1 shows a relationship of smaller peel angles correlating with a higher skill level of the surfer. Smaller wave peel angles increase the velocities of waves. A surfer must know how to react and paddle quickly to match the speed of the wave to catch it. Therefore, more experience is required to catch low peel angle waves. More experienced surfers can handle longer section lengths, increased velocities, and higher wave heights. Different locations offer different types of surfing conditions for each skill level.

=== Surf breaks ===
A surf break is an area with an obstruction or an object that causes a wave to break. Surf breaks entail multiple scale phenomena. Wave section creation has microscale factors of peel angle and wave breaking intensity. The micro-scale components influence wave height and variations on wave crests. The mesoscale components of surf breaks are the ramp, platform, wedge, or ledge that may be present at a surf break. Macro-scale processes are the global winds that initially produce offshore waves. Types of surf breaks are headlands (point break), beach break, river/estuary entrance bar, reef breaks, and ledge breaks.

==== Headland (point break) ====
A headland or point break interacts with the water by causing refraction around the point or headland. The point absorbs the high-frequency waves and long-period waves persist, which are easier to surf. Examples of locations that have headland or point break-induced surf breaks are Dunedin (New Zealand), Raglan (New Zealand), Malibu (California), Rincon (California), and Kirra (Australia).

==== Beach break ====
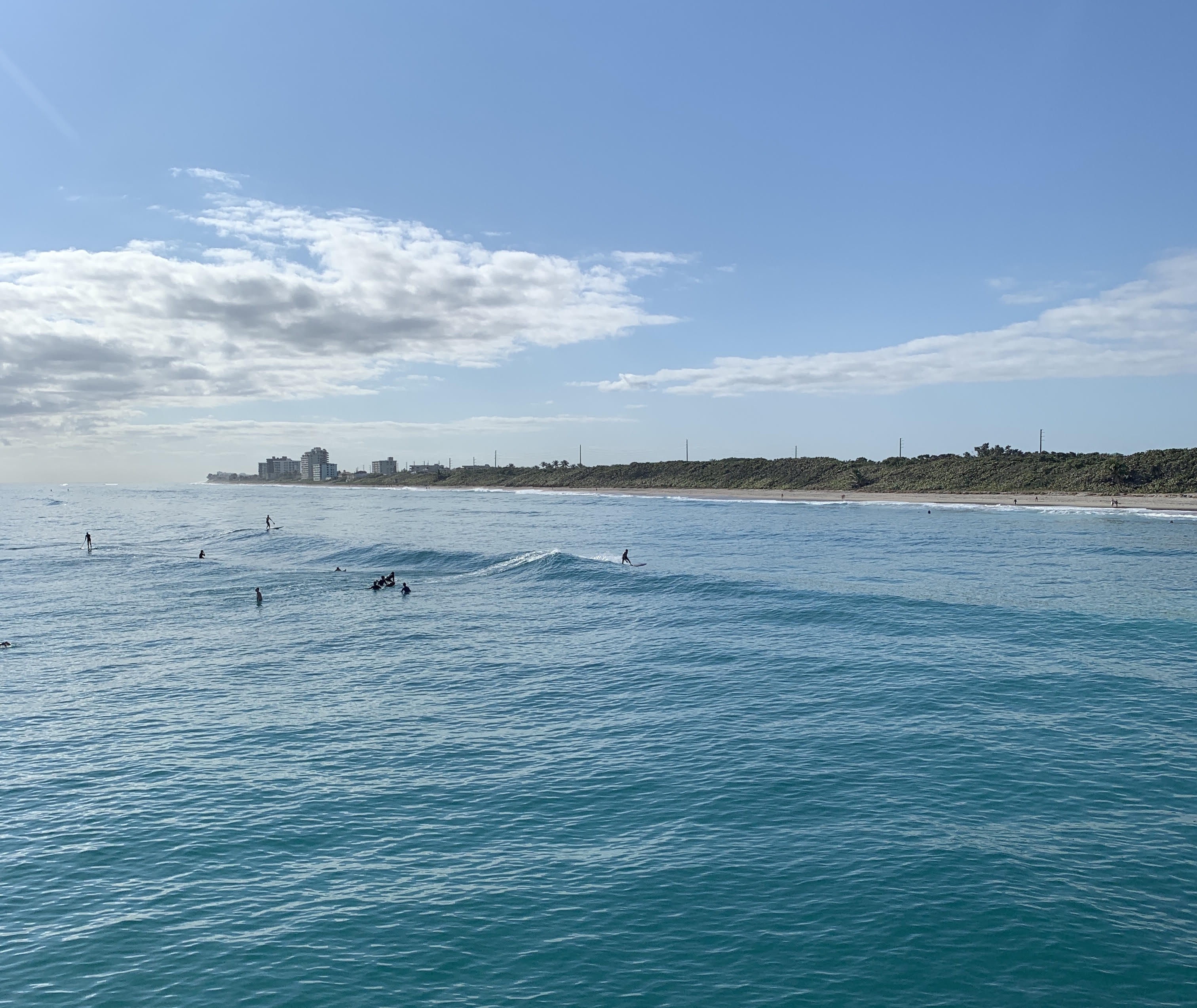
A group of surfers surfing a beach break in Juno Beach, Florida.

A beach break is an area of open coastline where the waves break over a sand-bottom. They are the most common, yet also the most volatile of surf breaks. Wave breaks happen successively at beach breaks, as in there are multiple peaks to surf at a single beach break location. Example locations are Tairua and Aramoana Beach (New Zealand) and the Gold Coast (Australia).

==== River or estuary entrance bar ====
A river or estuary entrance bar creates waves from the ebb-tidal delta, sediment outflow, and tidal currents. An ideal estuary entrance bar exists in Whangamata Bar, New Zealand.

==== Reef break ====
A reef break is conducive to surfing because large waves consistently break over the reef. The reef is usually made of coral, and because of this, many injuries occur while surfing reef breaks. However, the waves that are produced by reef breaks are some of the best in the world. Famous reef breaks are present in Padang Padang (Indonesia), Pipeline (Hawaii), Uluwatu (Bali), and Teahupo'o (Tahiti).

==== Ledge break ====
A ledge break is formed by steep rocks ledges that make intense waves because the waves travel through deeper water then abruptly reach shallower water at the ledge. Shark Island, Australia is a location with a ledge break. Ledge breaks create difficult surfing conditions, sometimes only allowing body surfing as the only feasible way to confront the waves.

=== Rip currents ===
Rip currents are fast, narrow currents that are caused by onshore transport within the surf zone and the successive return of the water seaward. The wedge bathymetry makes a convenient and consistent rip current of 5–10 meters that brings the surfers to the "take-off point" then out to the beach.

Oceanographers have two theories on rip current formation. The wave interaction model assumes that two edges of waves interact, create differing wave heights, and cause longshore transport of nearshore currents. The Boundary Interaction Model assumes that the topography of the sea bottom causes nearshore circulation and longshore transport; the result of both models is a rip current.

Rip currents can be extremely strong and narrow as they extend out of the surf zone into deeper water, reaching speeds from 0.5 m/s (1.6 ft/s) and up to 2.5 m/s (8.2 ft/s), which is faster than any human can swim. The water in the jet is sediment rich, bubble rich, and moves rapidly. The rip head of the rip current has long shore movement. Rip currents are common on beaches with mild slopes that experience sizeable and frequent oceanic swell.

=== On the surfboard ===
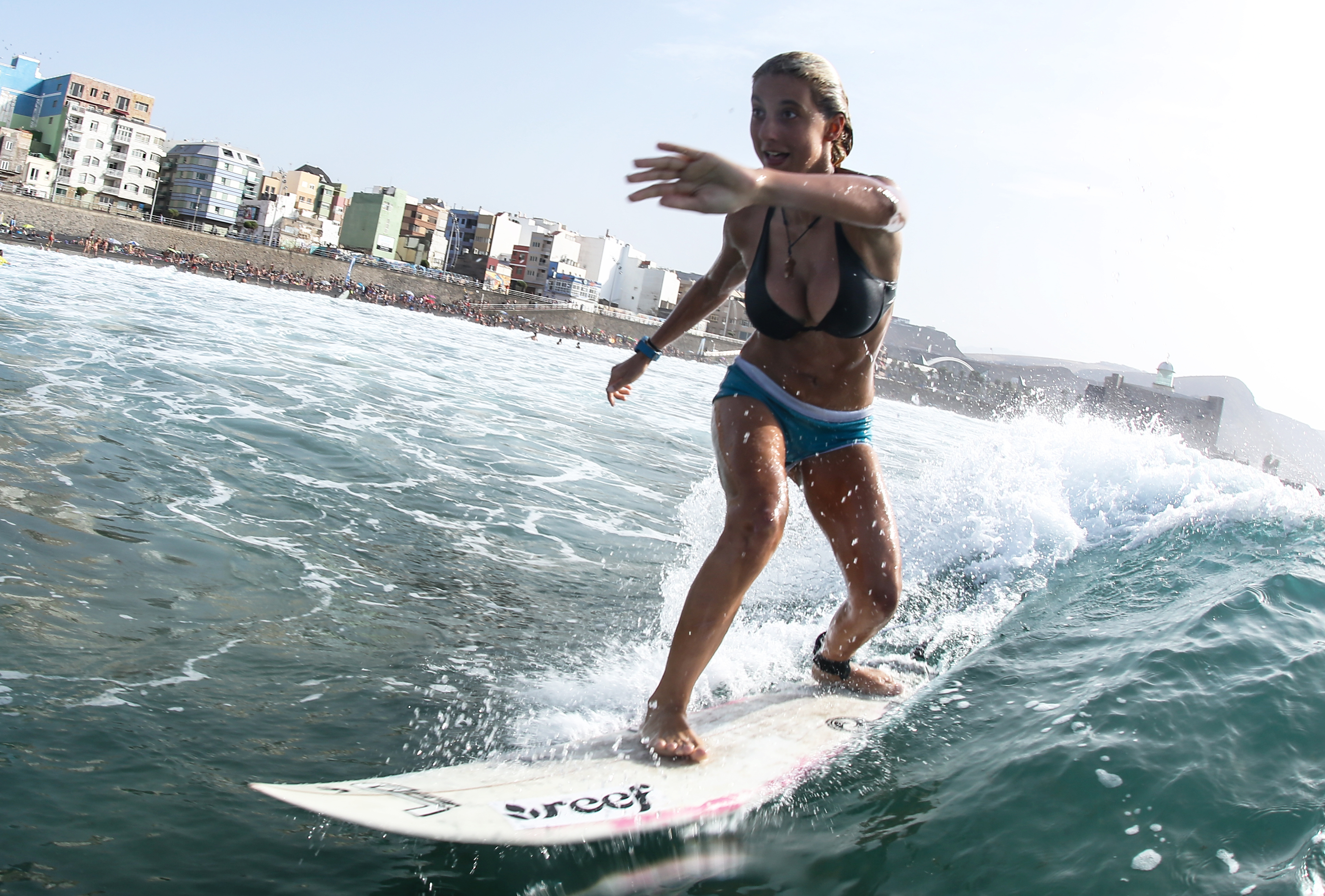
Riding on the surfboard

A longer surfboard of 300 cm (10 ft) causes more friction with the water; therefore, it will be slower than a smaller and lighter board with a length of 180 cm (6 ft). Longer boards are good for beginners who need help balancing. Smaller boards are good for more experienced surfers who want to have more control and maneuverability.

When practicing the sport of surfing, the surfer paddles out past the wave break to wait for a wave. When a surfable wave arrives, the surfer must paddle extremely fast to match the velocity of the wave so the wave can accelerate him or her.

When the surfer is at wave speed, the surfer must quickly pop up, stay low, and stay toward the front of the wave to become stable and prevent falling as the wave steepens. The acceleration is less toward the front than toward the back. The physics behind the surfing of the wave involves the horizontal acceleration force (F·sinθ) and the vertical force (F·cosθ=mg). Therefore, the surfer should lean forward to gain speed, and lean on the back foot to brake. Also, to increase the length of the ride of the wave, the surfer should travel parallel to the wave crest.

== Dangers ==
=== Drowning ===
Surfing, like all water sports, carries the inherent risk of drowning. Although the board assists a surfer in staying buoyant, it can become separated from the user. A leash, attached to the ankle or knee, can keep a board from being swept away, but does not keep a rider on the board or above water. In some cases, possibly including the drowning of professional surfer Mark Foo, the leash can be a cause of drowning by snagging on a reef or other object and holding the surfer underwater. By keeping the surfboard close to the surfer during a wipeout, a leash also increases the chances that the board may strike the rider, which could knock them unconscious and lead to drowning (especially with a hard surfboard instead of a soft surfboard). A fallen rider's board can become trapped in larger waves, and if the rider is attached by a leash, they can be dragged for long distances underwater. Surfers should be careful to remain in smaller surf until they have acquired the advanced skills and experience necessary to handle bigger waves and more challenging conditions. Even world-class surfers have drowned in extremely challenging conditions.

=== Collisions ===
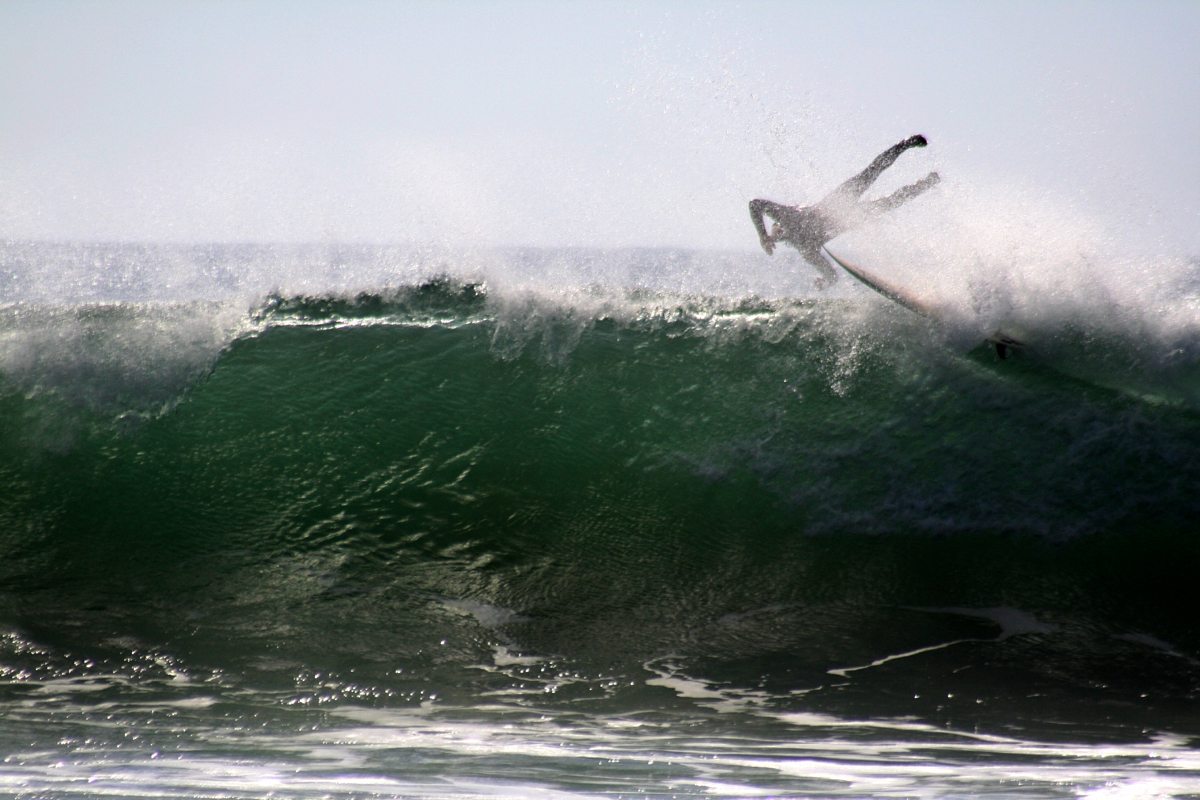
A surfer exiting a closeout

Under the wrong set of conditions, anything that a surfer's body can come in contact with is a potential hazard, including sand bars, rocks, small ice, reefs, surfboards, and other surfers. Collisions with these objects can sometimes cause injuries such as cuts and scrapes and in rare instances, death.

A large number of injuries, up to 66%, are caused by collision with a surfboard (nose or fins). Fins can cause deep lacerations and cuts, as well as bruising. While these injuries can be minor, they can open the skin to infection from the sea; groups like Surfers Against Sewage campaign for cleaner waters to reduce the risk of infections. Local bugs and diseases can be risk factors when surfing around the globe.

Falling off a surfboard or colliding with others is commonly referred to as a wipeout.

=== Marine life ===
Sea life can sometimes cause injuries (Bethany Hamilton) and even fatalities. Animals such as sharks, stingrays, Weever fish, seals and jellyfish can sometimes present a danger. Warmer-water surfers often do the "stingray shuffle" as they walk out through the shallows, shuffling their feet in the sand to scare away stingrays that may be resting on the bottom.

=== Rip currents ===
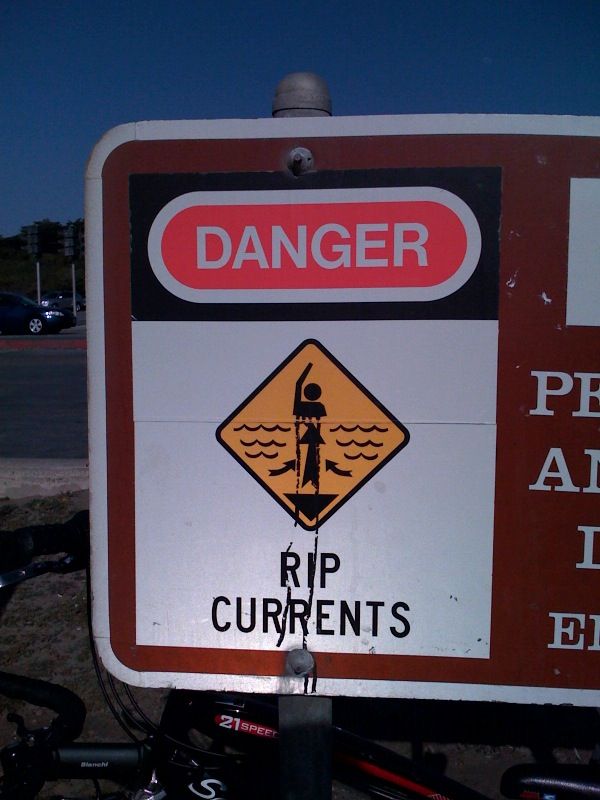
Rip current warning sign

Rip currents are water channels that flow away from the shore. Under the wrong circumstances these currents can endanger both experienced and inexperienced surfers. Since a rip current appears to be an area of flat water, tired or inexperienced swimmers or surfers may enter one and be carried out beyond the breaking waves. Although many rip currents are much smaller, the largest rip currents have a width of 12–15 m (40–50 ft). The flow of water moving out towards the sea in a rip will be stronger than most swimmers, making swimming back to shore difficult, however, by paddling parallel to the shore, a surfer can easily exit a rip current. Alternatively, some surfers actually ride on a rip current because it is a fast and effortless way to get out beyond the zone of breaking waves.

=== Seabed ===
The seabed can pose a risk for surfers. If a surfer falls while riding a wave, the wave tosses and tumbles the surfer around, often in a downwards direction. At reef breaks and beach breaks, surfers have been seriously injured and even killed, because of a violent collision with the sea bed, the water above which can sometimes be very shallow, especially at beach breaks or reef breaks during low tide. Cyclops, Western Australia, for example, is one of the biggest and thickest reef breaks in the world, with waves measuring up to 10 m (33 ft) high, but the reef below is only about 2 m (7 ft) below the surface of the water.

=== Microorganisms ===
A January 2018 study by the University of Exeter called the "Beach Bum Survey" found surfers and bodyboarders to be three times as likely as non-surfers to harbor antibiotic-resistant E. coli and four times as likely to harbor other bacteria capable of easily becoming antibiotic resistant. The researchers attributed this to the fact that surfers swallow roughly ten times as much seawater as swimmers.

=== Ear damage ===
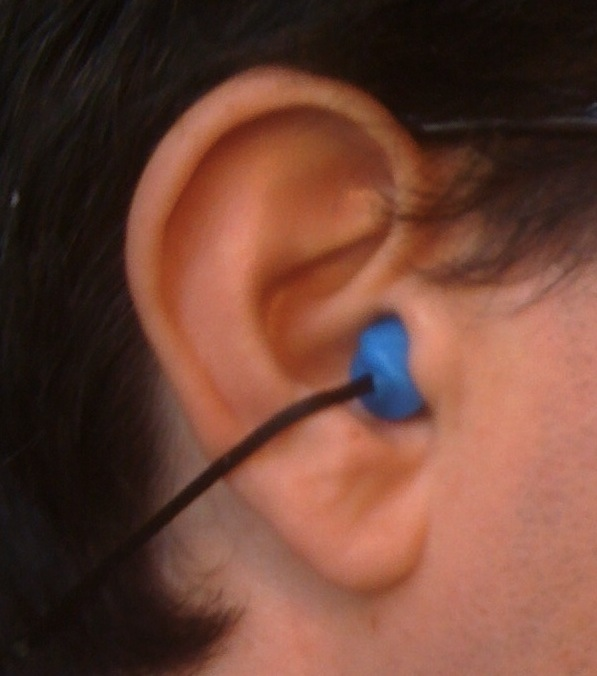
Man wearing protective ear plugs

Surfers sometimes use ear protection such as ear plugs to avoid surfer's ear, inflammation of the ear or other damage. Surfer's ear is where the bone near the ear canal grows after repeated exposure to cold water, making the ear canal narrower. The narrowed canal makes it harder for water to drain from the ear. This can result in pain, infection and sometimes ringing of the ear.

Ear plugs designed for surfers, swimmers and other water athletes are primarily made to keep water out of the ear, thereby letting a protective pocket of air stay inside the ear canal. They can also block cold air, dirt and bacteria. Many designs are made to let sound through, and either float and/or have a leash in case the plug accidentally gets bumped out.

=== Surf rash ===
Surf rash appears in many different ways on the skin, commonly as a painful red bumpy patch located on the surfer's chest or inner legs. A rash guard will lessen the incidence of surf rash caused by abrasion or sunburn. Healing ointments such as petroleum jelly can be used to treat irritated skin.

=== Spinal cord ===
Surfer's myelopathy is a rare spinal cord injury causing paralysis of the lower extremities, caused by hyperextension of the back. This is due to one of the main blood vessels of the spine becoming kinked, depriving the spinal cord of oxygen. In some cases the paralysis is permanent. Although any activity where the back is arched can cause this condition (i.e. yoga, pilates, etc.), this rare phenomenon has most often been seen in those surfing for the first time. According to DPT Sergio Florian, some recommendations for preventing myelopathy is proper warm up, limiting the session length and sitting on the board while waiting for waves, rather than lying.

== Surfers and surf culture ==
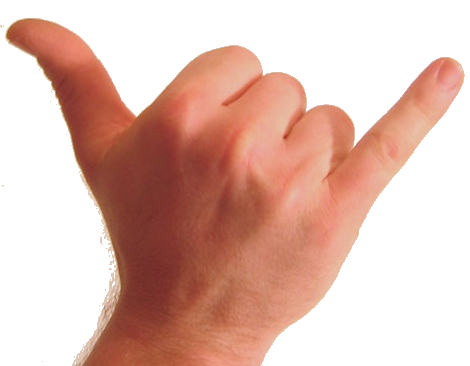
The Shaka sign

Surfers represent a diverse culture based on riding the waves. Some people practice surfing as a recreational activity, while others make it the central focus of their lives. Surfing culture in the US is most dominant in Hawaii and California, because these two states offer the best surfing conditions. However, waves can be found wherever there is coastline, and a tight-knit yet far-reaching subculture of surfers has emerged throughout America. Some historical markers of the culture included the woodie, the station wagon used to carry surfers' boards, as well as boardshorts, the long swim shorts typically worn while surfing. Surfers also wear wetsuits in colder regions and when the seasons cool the air and water.

During the 1960s, as surfing caught on in California, its popularity spread through American pop culture. Several teen movies, starting with the Gidget series in 1959, transformed surfing into a dream life for American youth. Later movies, including Beach Party (1963), Ride the Wild Surf (1964), and Beach Blanket Bingo (1965) promoted the California dream of sun and surf. Surf culture also fueled the early records of the Beach Boys.

The sport is also a significant part of Australia's eastern coast sub-cultural life, especially in New South Wales, where the weather and water conditions are most favourable for surfing.

The sport of surfing now represents a multibillion-dollar industry, especially in clothing and fashion markets. Founded in 1964, the International Surfing Association (ISA) is the oldest foundation associated with surfing formed to better improve surfing and recognized by the International Olympic Committee as the leading authority on surfing. National and international surf competitions began in 1964. In addition, The World Surf League (WSL) was established in 1976 and promotes various championship tours, hosting top competitors in some of the best surf spots around the globe. A small number of people make a career out of surfing by receiving corporate sponsorships and performing for photographers and videographers in far-flung destinations; they are typically referred to as freesurfers. Sixty-six surfers on a 13 m (42 ft) long surfboard set a record in Huntington Beach, California for most people on a surfboard at one time. Dale Webster consecutively surfed for 14,641 days, making it his main life focus.

As of 2023, the Guinness Book of World Records recognized a 26.2 m (86 ft) wave ride by Sebastian Steudtner at Nazaré, Portugal as the largest wave ever surfed.

When the waves were flat, surfers persevered with sidewalk surfing, which is now called skateboarding. Sidewalk surfing has a similar feel to surfing and requires only a paved road or sidewalk. To create the feel of the wave, surfers even sneaked into empty backyard swimming pools to ride in, known as pool skating. Eventually, surfing made its way to the slopes with the invention of the Snurfer, later credited as the first snowboard. Many other board sports have been invented over the years, but all can trace their heritage back to surfing.

Many surfers claim to have a spiritual connection with the ocean, describing surfing, the surfing experience, both in and out of the water, as a type of spiritual experience or a religion. Recent academic studies and practitioner testimonies have demonstrated the mental health and well-being benefits of surfing which has spurred the development of para surfing and surf therapy.

== Competitions ==
Surfing was approved for inclusion in the Olympic Games by the International Olympic Committee in 2016, alongside skateboarding, sport climbing, karate, and baseball/softball, ahead of the Tokyo Olympics. It made its Olympic debut in 2021, when the pandemic-delayed 2020 Tokyo Games were held at Tsurigasaki Beach, with Ítalo Ferreira of Brazil and Carissa Moore of the United States winning the first gold medals. The sport returned at the 2024 Paris Olympics, contested at Teahupoʻo, Tahiti, where Kauli Vaast of France and Caroline Marks of the United States won gold. Surfing is scheduled to return at Lower Trestles, California, for the 2028 Los Angeles Games.

== See also ==
- Artificial wave pool
- ASP World Tour
- Big wave surfing
- Dog surfing
- Duke Kahanamoku
- The Endless Summer
- George Freeth
- Hawaiian scale
- History of surfing
- Lake surfing
- List of surfers
- List of surfing events
- List of surfing records
- List of surfing terminology
- Ocean wave
- Para surfing
- River surfing
- Sandboarding
- Skimboarding
- Standup paddleboarding
- Surf break
- Surf film
- Surf forecasting
- Surf lifesaving, Surf Life Saving Club and nippers
- Surf music
- Surf therapy
- Surf zone
- Surfer's ear
- List of "Surfing in ..." articles

- Surfing in Canada
- Surfing in Madeira
- Surfing in Scotland
- Surfing in the United States

- Triple Crown of Surfing
- Women's surfing
- World Championship Tour (WCT)
- World surfing champion
