= Surf forecasting =

Surf forecasting is the process of using offshore swell data to predict onshore wave conditions. It is used by millions of people across the world, including professionals who put their forecasts online, meteorologists who work for news crews, and surfers all over the world. It is impossible to make an exact prediction of the surf (shape and size of breaking waves), but by knowing a few factors a good prediction can be made. One needs to have an understanding of how waves are formed, a basic knowledge of bathymetry, and information (such as tides, location, and weather) about the surf spot being forecasted to accurately forecast the surf.

== Offshore swells ==
=== How waves are made ===
Waves are created as wind blows over the ocean, transferring its energy into the water. The size of the swell is affected by three variables: the velocity of the wind, its duration, and its fetch, or distance the wind blows over.

=== Swells ===
There are two different types of swell that affect the surf conditions:

- Groundswell refers to waves generated far off of the coast. A groundswell is associated with long-period swells.
- Wind swell refers to waves formed from local winds to the specific surf spot. A wind swell is associated with short-period swells.

In general groundswell produces waves that are much better for surfing. Wind swell is usually smaller, and almost always choppier and harder to surf than groundswell. Although both are present at most surf spots, groundswell creates much better breaking waves and dominates the lineup. This distinct separation occurs because groundswell originates far from the shore and has more time to separate into organized patterns, which are much easier to surf.

=== Swell data ===
In order to forecast the surf, there is important data from the swells that need to be analyzed. There are three main factors used in surf forecasting:

- Swell height is the height of the swell in deep water.
- Swell direction is the direction from which the swell is coming. It is measured in degrees (as on a compass), and often referred to in general directions, such as a NNW or SW swell.
- Swell period is an important factor in surf forecasting. It is a measurement of time between successive waves in seconds. If you multiply the swell period by 1.5 you will calculate the speed in knots of the wave group for deep water. Waves travel in groups, with the individual wave traveling twice as fast the group. In general waves will be referred to as either short period (15 seconds or less) or long period waves(16 or more seconds). The swell period will give you information about how the swell will affect specific breaks differently.

These three pieces of information are the main key to forecasting the surf. If there is a swell of significant height that is headed in the direction of the break you are forecasting for, then there probably will be good surf. The swell period will tell you how much a swell will wrap into a spot and how much it will grow in deep water.

== Using bathymetry to predict surf for a specific break ==
=== Wrapping and refraction ===
One important fact about waves is that they focus more of their energy towards shallower water. Waves will always turn and refract towards shallower water. This is where swell period can drastically affect the conditions. The longer the period of the swell the more it tends to wrap into a spot. This means that a swell might cause waves in a spot even if it is not directed at the spot. Significant underwater irregularities, such as underwater canyons and sea mounts, can also affect how the waves come into a surf spot. Irregularities like these may cause the surf to be much larger at one spot, while almost nonexistent at another nearby. This is the case at surf spots such as Black's Beach, El Porto, and Mavericks.

== Knowing your break ==
Using swell data, which is readily available on the internet, it is possible to predict how the surf will be for a fairly large area. However, the waves can differ drastically from spot to spot and from time to time. To accurately forecast the swell conditions for a spot, it is needed to understand how different conditions affect the waves there.

Professional and advanced surfers tend to write surf logs or journals to document environment specific parameters such as wave size, tide height to learn and remember spot specifics and notable surf sessions.

=== Types of breaks ===
The shape of the ocean floor affects the break greatly. In general there are gradual sloping ocean floors which result in a slower crumpling wave (better for long boarding) and steeper sloping floors which result in a faster, hollower breaking wave (better for short boarding). There are also many different types of breaks:

- Beachbreaks are the most common breaks in the world. The primary characteristic of a beach break is that the waves break over a sandbar bottom. They have many random qualities in the ocean floor, that can cause the waves to be either very good or very poor, which make them extremely difficult to accurately forecast for. The quality of the waves is decided by the shapes of the sand bars at the bottom. These sandbars are always moving and adjusting due to big swells and storms, so a beachbreak will change qualities over time. There are some things that can affect the sand bars at a beachbreak:
  - Water sources such as a river mouth or sewer drain can create well defined sandbars after a big outflow of water.
  - Piers usually have deep channels directly under them which can form sandbars on the sides, making better waves at the pier.
  - Jetties Smaller jetties cause sand to build up on the tip, allowing good sandbars to form. Large jetties can actually cause the waves to reflect off the jetty and wedge into the next wave making larger and better waves. The impact of jetties is especially evident at the breaks in Newport Beach.
- Reefs are breaks that have rock bottoms instead of sand bottoms. They have deeper channels next to the shallower water which gives a good form to the wave. They can often force waves to shoal quickly from deep to shallow water causing large and hollow surf.
- Pointbreaks are breaks in which the waves bend and break around a specific point, usually resulting in consistent and good shape. Point breaks are usually formed by river mouths with loose rock bottoms.

=== Weather and tides ===
There are many other factors that affect the wave quality at a specific surf break, including wind conditions and tides. In general, wave quality for surfing is usually better with less wind. If there is wind, wave quality is better if the wind is blowing gently offshore (away from the coast, towards the water.) This offshore airflow helps to hold up the face of breaking waves slightly longer, allowing a surfer to have more time to maneuver on the face of the wave.

Tide levels are an extremely important factor that also impact surf conditions. Tides, which occur from varying gravitational forces between the Sun, Moon, and the Earth, are easy to predict far in advance. However, the effect of tides on wave quality differs between surf breaks. Some breaks can be excellent on a low tide, but can suffer from a drastic drop in wave quality during a high tide, during which the water depth is too great, causing the wave face to break more slowly and with less power. Other surf breaks may experience the opposite effect and have better wave shape during high tide. Bathymetry, coastal geography, and man-made coastal features such as seawalls, harbors, piers, and dredging all impact how a surf break will respond to tides.

== Gathering information ==
The only way to tell how specific conditions will affect the surf in a specific spot is to spend time observing that spot. One of the attributes of surf is that no two waves are the same, let alone two surfing spots. It requires a great deal of observation time to figure out which conditions make a particular spot good and which conditions do not. Only then can an accurate forecast of the surf for any conditions be made.

It is also important to notice the difference between a surf forecast and a surf report. A surf forecast is a prediction of what to expect from waves in the future. A surf report is a report of the conditions on that current day, typically given by someone who has watched the waves first-hand.

== Governmental agencies ==
The National Weather Service in Honolulu, Hawai'i, publishes surf forecasts for O'ahu.
