= Rush Sturges =

American kayaker, film maker, and musician

Rush Sturges (born February 14, 1985) is an American professional whitewater kayaker, film maker, and musician.

Sturges has been a professional whitewater kayaker for over 20 years. He is a former freestyle kayak Junior World Champion (2003), has represented the United States Kayaking Team at the World Championships four times and has been named among the 20 Greatest Outdoor Athletes Now by Outside Magazine.

His work documenting whitewater expeditions and first descents has been featured in numerous publications, including Outside, Men's Journal, Red Bull Media, ESPN, National Geographic Adventure, Outdoor Magazine, and more.

Sturges is well known for his documentary film making and has produced, directed, and appeared in numerous films through his production company River Roots. Among his awarded films are "Snow Leopard Sisters" (2025), "The River Runner" (2021), and "Chasing Niagara" (2015).

Sturges founded River Roots Productions in 2009 where he's built a reputation for documenting cutting edge descents and world records.

== Kayaking career ==
Sturges is considered one of the most well-rounded professional kayakers in the industry with accomplishments in freestyle, waterfalls, big water, steep creeking, and expedition kayaking. He is credited with having invented several freestyle kayaking moves including the Pistol Flip and the Hail Mary, a front flip off a waterfall.

In 2003, Sturges won the Junior World Championships of freestyle kayaking in Graz, Austria. After turning 18 he returned to represent the United States at the world championships three more times.

In 2007, Sturges attempted to break the world record waterfall descent of 107 ft Alexandra Falls and nearly drowned in the process. In 2009, he broke his back on 80 ft Bonito Falls in Argentina.

In 2011, Sturges, along with Steve Fisher, Tyler Bradt, and Benny Marr, achieved the first successful descent of the largest rapids in the world, the Grand Inga Rapids on the Congo River. In the Grand Inga section, the Congo River flows at an average rate of 1.6 million Cubic Feet per Second (CFS), approximately 50 times the average flow of the Grand Canyon. Sturges, Fisher, Bradt, and Marr, successfully navigated the rapids which had taken the lives of seven people who previously attempted the run. The expedition was documented in the feature-length documentary The Grand Inga Project released in 2012.

A Siskiyou Daily News article written at the time quoted Sturges describing the experience: "When you're dealing with that much current and that much volume, you're dealing with features that nobody's ever seen before... You occasionally encounter small whirlpools on some rivers, but these were 30 to 40 feet across. If you get sucked into those things you're screwed. It's just so unpredictable and random."

Sturges contracted malaria during the course of the expedition and was hospitalized upon his return to the United States with a flesh eating bacteria attacking a cut on his elbow.

Sturges has twice competed in the Whitewater Grand Prix, placing 3rd in 2012 and 2nd in 2014. The two week event is designed to crown the best all around kayaker in the world, through competitions in big water, steep creeking, and freestyle. In 2015, he placed 2nd in the Waterfall World Championships.

In 2016 Sturges achieved viral fame for his YouTube video "Kayakers Lose Control in Drainage Ditch" which has been viewed over 5 million times on YouTube. In the video, Sturges and Benny Marr careen down a drainage ditch in British Columbia, reaching speeds of 72 kilometers/hour (45 miles/hour). The moment was captured by a Thrillest article titled "Watch These Morons Nearly Die Kayaking Down A Mountain".

The two returned to the drainage ditch in 2017, this time in a tandem kayak. The "Return to the Ditch" video has been viewed more than 17 million times on YouTube and drew condemnations from Peter DeJong, the chief administrative officer of the nearby village of Lions Bay, as well as Rand Chatterjee, of the Sea Kayak Association of British Columbia, who remarked "they were going faster than I could say they could survive."

For his numerous accomplishments in whitewater kayaking Rush Sturges was named an Outdoor Idol by the Outdoor Industry Foundation. In 2004, Outside Magazine recognized him as one of the 20 greatest outdoor athletes now, alongside Big Wave Surfer Laird Hamilton, outdoor athlete Jimmy Chin, gold-medal swimmer Michael Phelps, skateboarder Danny Way, and snowboarder Keir Dillon, among others. In 2013, Sturges was recognized along with Fisher, Bradt, and Marr as National Geographic Adventurers of the Year Team, for their descent of the Congo River. And in 2012, he was recognized as Adventurer of the Year by Men's Journal and Outdoor Adventurer of the Year by Outside Magazine.

== Documentary film making career ==
Rush Sturges is known for award-winning feature-length documentary films blending adventure sports with emotional storytelling and cutting-edge cinematography. He has produced and/or directed more than 20 documentary films and a number of music videos.

Sturges began his film making career in 2001 as a member of Young Guns Productions. In 2009 he founded River Roots Productions.

As a filmmaker, Sturges has documented cutting edge descents and world records, including Tyler Bradt's record waterfall descent of 189 ft. Palouse Falls in 2009. Sturges featured the footage in his film "Dream Result" (2010).

In 2015 Sturges documented Rafa Ortiz's multi year training to kayak Niagara Falls. The project was acquired by Red Bull Media House and Starz and released as the full-length documentary film "Chasing Niagara" under Sturges' own River Roots Productions. Variety Magazine hailed "Chasing Niagara" as "the biggest, and most artistically ambitious, big waterfall kayak movie ever made". The film won critical acclaim and was selected as the Best Film for Mountain Sports at the 2015 Banff Mountain Film and Book Festival.

"Chasing Niagara" follows Rafa Ortiz on a three-year journey to train for a harrowing descent of Niagara Falls. Featuring Ortiz, Sturges, Evan Garcia, Aniol Serrasolses, and Gerd Serrasolses, it is shot on location on the rivers of Veracruz, Mexico, as well as Washington and Oregon in the United States, before culminating at Niagara Falls on the border between the United States and Canada.

The film's protagonist, Ortiz, said about the production: "On one hand, 'Chasing Niagara' is about a character, Rafa Ortiz, with his friend Rush Sturges. But I lived a parallel experience, about a character called Rush Sturges, who was trying, with his friend Rafa Ortiz, to make a film which had a story that transcended everything he had made up to that point."

In 2021, Sturges released his second documentary feature "The River Runner" on Netflix following the life of world famous expedition kayaker Scott Lindgren about his 20-year journey to be the first person to run the four rivers that originate from Mount Kailash in Tibet. A review in Spling Movies notes that the River Runner "isn't an ordinary documentary but rather an emotive character portrait".

"The River Runner" documents Lindgren's career as an early pioneer of expedition kayaking and documents his battle with a pituitary adenoma (a type of brain cancer). After setting a goal to paddle the four rivers flowing from the sacred Mount Kailash, Lindgren completed expeditions on the Karnali, Sutlej, and Tsangpo rivers before his cancer ended his dreams. After brain surgery and rehabilitation, Lindgren was invited to join Aniol Serrasolses, Mike Dawson, Ben Marr, Brendan Wells, and Rush Sturges to complete the quartet by running the Indus River.

"The River Runner" culminates with the successful expedition down the Indus which Lindgren completes at the age of 47. The film, produced and directed by Sturges, was released to critical acclaim, was selected as the Best Film for Mountain Sports at the 2021 Banff Mountain Film and Book Festival: won Official Selection at the Telluride Mountain Film Festival, the Breck Film Festival, and the BendFilm Festival; and received distribution on Netflix.

Following the release of "The River Runner", Sturges embarked on a series of short film projects tackling the intersection of action sports and social and environmental justice.

His 2021 short film "The Land of the Yakamas" is a moving portrait of the land that Sturges calls home around the sacred Pahto (Mt. Adams) and the enduring connection of the native Yakama people to the land, rivers, and animals of the area. The film features interviews with Yakama community leaders and stunning cinematography by Matt Baker, Skip Armstrong, and Sturges himself.

In 2022, Sturges released "Before I Die", chronicling the story of Tristan Bussell who, following a diagnosis of Early Onset Alzheimer's (the same disease that killed his father) sets out to fulfill his dream of kayaking off a waterfall.

Also in 2022, Sturges released "Paddle Tribal Waters" which follows a group of teenagers from the Indigenous Klamath, Maqlaq, Karuk, Hoopa, Yurok, and other tribes native to the Klamath River of Oregon and California as they set out to be the first to navigate the river following the historic removal of four dams. The film was awarded Best Short at the 2023 Wild & Scenic Film Festival and features the young athletes and their Native American teachers as they learn whitewater skills and life lessons in a program run by the nonprofit Rios to Rivers. Sturges releases two other Paddle Tribal Waters shirt films in 2023 and 2024. The collection are precursors to a longer project currently under development.

In 2023 Sturges was featured in Jimmy Chin's "Edge of The Unknown" series for his role in helping rescue and resuscitate his teammate, Gerd Serrasolses, in a kayaking accident on the Rio Tulijá in Veracruz, Mexico.

In 2025, Sturges Co-Directed and Executive Produced on two short films on the impact of plastic pollution around the world. "The Human Side of Plastic: Babacar Thiaw" profiles a visionary Senegalese surfer, entrepreneur, and environmental activist, is on a mission to tackle his country's escalating plastic pollution crisis and preserve its coastline for future generations. The film was awarded three Gold Awards at the 2025 Global Indie Film Awards and Best Documentary at the 2025 Vienna International Film Awards among other prizes. "The Human Side of Plastic: Abby Barrows" tells the story of one of the world's most productive lobster ports 0n Deer Isle, Maine where warming waters and invisible microplastic pollution threaten a centuries-old way of life. It won the Gold Award for Best Documentary at the 2025 Hollywood Independent Filmmaker Awards among other awards.

Sturges also served as Executive Producer and Cinematographer on the 2025 film "Snow Leopard Sisters." The film follows Tshiring Lhamu Lama as she travels alone to her home in a remote corner of the Himalayas, vowing to end retaliatory killings of local snow leopards. To succeed, she must first convince her young apprentice Tenzin to love the animals that have taken everything from her and her family. "Snow Leopard Sisters" premiered at South by Southwest in 2025 and won the People’s Choice Award at the 2025 Wild & Scenic Film Festival among other awards.

== Other film and media ==
Rush Sturges has produced and/or directed a number of music videos for artists Free Creatures, The Wind Fields, Matthew Jo, as well as his own music.

He has also produced content for GoPro, VisitMexico, CNN, Dagger Kayaks, Discovery, Toyota, Ford, ESPN, National Geographic, Red Bull, Outside, Smith, Sweet Protection, Universal, The Weather Channel, Netflix, Polaris, Disney, and others.

== Musical career ==
Rush Sturges performs a blend of hip hop and folk-inspired rock, which he dubs "folk hop". He has released three full-length albums including "The Road is Gold" (2010), "A Life Worth Living" (2016), and "Lessons in Folk Hop" (2024) on his River Roots Records label. "Lessons in Folk Hop: The Remix Album" was released in 2025.

Sturges has released songs featuring John Craigie, the Shook Twins, Hendri Coetzee, 2Mex, and many other artists.

His music draws on themes related to his upbringing in the remote mountains of Northern California, his connection to the environment, and his career in whitewater kayaking, as well as universal concepts such as personal and spiritual growth, the loss of close friends, and more.

His songs have been featured in various kayaking movies and adventure films.

== Personal life ==
Rush Sturges grew up in Forks of Salmon, California, where his parents owned and operated Otter Bar Lodge, a destination kayak school on the Salmon River. He began kayaking at the age of 10 and began competing at age 13.

Sturges attended Etna High School in Etna, California until his Junior Year when he joined World Class Academy, a traveling high school for students who want to earn their education while exploring unique rivers and cultures around the world.

When he's not on the road, pursuing his many athletic and artistic projects, Sturges resides in White Salmon, Washington, where he runs River Roots Productions.

== Filmography ==
Documentary and Adventure:

Year	Film	Production company	Director	Producer	Cinematographer	Editor	Athlete	Ref.
2002	The Next Generation	Young Gun Productions	Yes	Yes	Yes	Yes	Yes	
2004	New Reign	Young Gun Productions	Yes	Yes	Yes	Yes	Yes	
2006	Dynasty	Young Gun Productions	Yes	Yes	Yes	Yes	Yes	
2008	Source	Young Gun Productions	Yes	Yes	Yes	Yes	Yes	
2009	Africa Revolutions Tour	River Roots and Revolutionary Innovations	Yes	Yes	Yes	Yes	Yes	
2010	Dream Result	River Roots and Revolutionary Innovations	Yes	Yes	Yes	Yes	Yes	
2011	Frontier	River Roots	Yes	Yes	Yes	Yes	Yes	
2013	Congo: The Grand Inga Project	Fish Munga and Red Bull Media House	No	No	No	No	Yes	
2013	Beyond the Drop (short)	Teva and Gnarly Bay	No	Yes	No	No	Yes	
2013	Explorers: Adventures of the Century (Episode)	Red Bull TV	Yes	No	No	No	Yes	
2015	Chasing Niagara	River Roots and Red Bull	Yes	Yes	Yes	Yes	Yes	
2017	Ultimate Rush (Episode)	Red Bull TV	Yes	Yes	Yes	Yes	No	
2017	Spirit of the Wabakimi (short)	National Geographic and Explore Canada	Yes	Yes	Yes	No	Yes	
2021	The River Runner	River Roots	Yes	Yes	Yes	Yes	Yes	
2021	Land of the Yakamas (short)	River Roots and the Yakama Nation	Yes	Yes	Yes	Yes	No	
2022	Before I Die (short)	River Roots	Yes	Yes	No	Yes	No	
2022	Paddle Tribal Waters (short)	River Roots and Rios to Rivers	Yes	Yes	Yes	Yes	No	
2023	A Baffin Vacation (short)	Whitewater	Yes	Yes	No	Yes	No	
2023	Edge of the Unknown (Episode)	Edgeworx Studios, Little Monster Films, and National Geographic	No	No	No	No	Yes	
2023	Paddle Tribal Waters — Season 2 (short)	River Roots and Rios to Rivers	Yes	Yes	Yes	Yes	No	
2023	Near the River (short)	River Roots	No	Yes	No	No	No	
2024	Paddle Tribal Waters — Season 3 (short)	River Roots and Rios to Rivers	Yes	Yes	Yes	Yes	No	
2025	The Human Side of Plastic: Babacar Thiaw	SC Johnson	Yes	Yes (Executive)	No	No	No	
2025	The Human Side of Plastic: Abby Barrows	SC Johnson	Yes	Yes (Executive)	No	No	No	
2025	Snow Leopard Sisters	Appian Way and Noah Media Group	No	Yes (Executive)	Yes	No	No	

Music Videos:

Year	Film	Artist	Director	Producer	Cinematographer	Editor	Performer	Ref.
2019	"Get That"	Free Creatures	Yes	Yes	No	Yes	No	
2021	"Get It"	The Wind Fields	Yes	Yes	No	No	No	
2023	"Capsized"	Rush Sturges	No	Yes	No	No	Yes	
2023	"DIZZY"	Matthew Jo	Yes	Yes	No	Yes	No	
2024	"Middle of Nowhere"	Rush Sturges	Yes	Yes	N/A	No	Yes	

== Discography ==
Sturges has released three full-length albums and featured on the soundtrack for his film "The River Runner" which was released as an EP with the band TapWater. His 2024 album, "A Life Worth Living" features production by Steve Berlin of Los Lobos.

The Road is Gold
- Released: 2010

A Life Worth Living
- Released: August 14, 2016
- Format: CD and Digital
- Label: River Roots Records
- Producer: Rudy Slizewski
- Singles: "A Life Worth Living", "For the Love", "Days Go By"

The River Runner EP, Music from the Feature Film (with TapWater)
- Released: August 20, 2021
- Format: Digital
- Label: Rudy Slizewski
- Producer: Rudy Slizewski
- Singles: "Riding on a High"

Lessons in Folk Hop
- Released: February 14, 2024
- Format: Vinyl (limited release), CD, and Digital
- Label: River Roots Records
- Producer: Steve Berlin and Rudy Slizewski
- Singles: "Wild Places", "Growing Up", "Live or Die", "Northern California", "Capsized", "Take Them River", "Riding on a High", "Hustler", "New Day"

Lessons in Folk Hop: The Remix Album
- Released: January 2, 2026
- Format: Digital
- Label: River Roots Records
- Producer: Steve Berlin, Rudy Slizewski, SugarBeats, Asher Fulero, Bnanaz, Sapient, David Ariza, Marv Ellis, Kennebec, Alex Asher Daniel
- Singles: "Wild Places", "Live or Die", "Northern California", "Capsized", "New Day", "I Won't Break", "Alien"

== Kayak competition and awards ==
- 2003 Junior World Champion (Graz, Austria)
- 2003 U.S. National Kayaking Team representative, World Championships (Graz, Austria)
- 2005 U.S. National Kayaking Team representative, World Championships (Penrith, Australia)
- 2007 U.S. National Kayaking Team representative, World Championships (Ottawa, Canada)
- 2009 U.S. National Kayaking Team representative, World Championships (Thun, Switzerland)
- 2011 Rider of the Year Award, Best Waterfall Line — First descent of Tomata 2 (Veracruz, Mexico)
- 2012 3rd Place Whitewater Grand Prix
- 2012 Rider of the Year Award, Expedition of the Year — The Congo River's Grand Inga Rapids (Democratic Republic of Congo)
- 2014 2nd Place Whitewater Grand Prix
- 2015 15th Place Adidas Sickline Extreme Kayak World Championship, 15th place (Ötztal, Austria)
- 2015 2nd Place Waterfall World Championships "Rey Del Rio" (Chiapas, Mexico)
- Achieved multiple national and international podium finishes in freestyle and creek race kayaking.

== Film Awards ==
- 2025 People’s Choice Award, Wild & Scenic Film Festival — "Snow Leopard Sisters"
- 2025 Best Feature, Alt EFF Film Festival — "Snow Leopard Sisters"
- 2025 Audience Award, Doctober Festival — "Snow Leopard Sisters"
- 2025 People’s Choice Award, Planet Focus International Environmental Film Festival — "Snow Leopard Sisters"
- 2025 Change Maker Award, Kendal Mountain Festival — "Snow Leopard Sisters"
- 2025 Best Film, People & Mountains, Ladek Mountain Festival — "Snow Leopard Sisters"
- 2025 Best Documentary, Vienna International Film Awards — "The Human Side of Plastic: Babacar Thiaw"
- 2025 Best Environmental Documentary, Soho London Independent Film Festival — "The Human Side of Plastic: Babacar Thiaw"
- 2025 Jury Prize Best Documentary, SAFILM — "The Human Side of Plastic: Babacar Thiaw"
- 2025 Best Director (Short Doc), New York Film & Cinematography Awards — "The Human Side of Plastic: Babacar Thiaw"
- 2025 Three Gold Awards, Global Indie Film Awards — "The Human Side of Plastic: Babacar Thiaw"
- 2025 Best Documentary Short, International Celebration of Cinema — "The Human Side of Plastic: Babacar Thiaw"
- 2025 Best Film Essay, Darkland Munich Film Awards — "The Human Side of Plastic: Babacar Thiaw"
- 2025 Winner, TVE Global Sustainability Film Awards — "The Human Side of Plastic: Abby Barrows"
- 2025 Gold Award (Best Documentary), Hollywood Independent Filmmaker Awards — "The Human Side of Plastic: Abby Barrows"
- 2025 Best Documentary, Big Water Film Festival — "The Human Side of Plastic: Abby Barrows"
- 2025 Best Documentary Short, Westminster Film Festival — "The Human Side of Plastic: Abby Barrows"
- 2025 Winner, CineYork — "The Human Side of Plastic: Abby Barrows"
- 2025 Best Documentary Short, International Celebration of Cinema — "The Human Side of Plastic: Abby Barrows"
- 2023 Best Short, Wild & Scenic Film Festival — "Paddle Tribal Waters"
- 2023 Selection, International Avant-Garde Film Festival — "Paddle Tribal Waters"
- 2021 Best Film for Mountain Sports, Banff Mountain Film and Book Festival — "The River Runner"
- 2015 Best Adventure Film, Breck Film Festival — "Chasing Niagara"
- 2015 Best Film for Mountain Sports, Banff Mountain Film and Book Festival — "Chasing Niagara"
