= ICF Canoe Freestyle World Championships =

Official World Championship event in canoeing

- Genre: Canoeing
- Frequency: Annual
- Location: Varies
- Inaugurated: 2007
- Previous event: 2023
- Next event: 2025
- Participants: Men and women
- Organiser: International Canoe Federation

The ICF Canoe Freestyle World Championships are an international event in canoe freestyle organized by the International Canoe Federation. The ICF World Championships have taken place since 2007 although there were some "unofficial" events since at least 1995. They have been held biennially since the beginning, except for 2021 when it was postponed to 2022.

== Venues ==
Edition	Year	Host city	Host Country	Elite events
1	2007	Ottawa	Canada	4
1	2009	Thun	Switzerland	6
1	2011	Plattling	Germany	6
1	2013	Nantahala River, SC	USA	6
1	2015	Ottawa River	Canada	6
1	2017	San Juan	Argentina	5
1	2019	Sort	Spain	6
1	2022	Nottingham	United Kingdom	6
1	2023	Columbus	USA	5
1	2025	Plattling	GER	5

== Medallists ==
=== Men ===
==== Kayak ====
Year	Winner	Runner-up	Third
2007	Eric Jackson (USA)	Peter Csonka (SVK)	Nick Troutman (CAN)
2009	Nick Troutman (CAN)	Eric Jackson (USA)	Stephen Wright (USA)
2011	James Bebbington (GBR)	Peter Csonka (SVK)	Stephen Wright (USA)
2013	Dane Jackson (USA)	Peter Csonka (SVK)	Tomasz Czaplicki (POL)
2015	Dane Jackson (USA)	Mathieu Dumoulin (FRA)	Nick Troutman (CAN)
2017	Joaquim Fontané (ESP)	Dane Jackson (USA)	Sebastien Devred (FRA)
2019	Dane Jackson (USA)	Joaquim Fontané (ESP)	Sebastien Devred (FRA)
2022	Dane Jackson (USA)	Tomasz Czaplicki (POL)	Harry Price (GBR)
2023	Dane Jackson (USA)	Nick Troutman (CAN)	Tom Dolle (FRA)
2025	Tom Dolle (FRA)	Tim Rees (GER)	Gavin Barker (GBR)

==== Junior Kayak ====
Year	Winner	Runner-up	Third
2007	Evan Garcia (USA)	[[]] (25x17px)	[[]] (25x17px)
2009	Jason Craig (USA)	Dane Jackson (USA)	Sebastien Devred (FRA)
2011	Dane Jackson (USA)	Joaquim Fontané (ESP)	Bren Orton (GBR)
2013	Hunter Katich (USA)	Max Karlsson (SWE)	Alec Voorhees (USA)
2015	Hugo Anthony (GBR)	Alec Voorhees (USA)	Hugo Scott (GBR)
2017	Tom Dolle (FRA)	Alex Walters (GBR)	Harry Price (GBR)
2019	Mason Hargrove (USA)	Dally Kellogg (USA)	Jack Newland (AUS)
2022	Tim Rees (GER)	Ben Higson (GBR)	Nanase Okazaki (JPN)
2023	Tim Rees (GER)	Onni Eronen (FIN)	Timmy Hill (GBR)

==== Squirt ====
Year	Winner	Runner-up	Third
2009	James Reeves (GBR)	Tour Ishihara (JPN)	Jeremy Lauks (USA)
2011	Dane Jackson (USA)	Jamie Austen (GBR)	Toru Ishihara (JPN)
2013	Clay Wright (USA)	Dane Jackson (USA)	Max Karlsson (SWE)
2015	Stephen Wright (USA)	Clay Wright (USA)	Benjamin White (GBR)
2017	Clay Wright (USA)	Alex Edwards (GBR)	David Rogers (GBR)
2019	Clay Wright (USA)	Alex Edwards (GBR)	Sam Wilson (GBR)
2022	Clay Wright (USA)	Alex Edwards (GBR)	Taft Sibley (USA)
2023	Taft Sibley (USA)	Andrew Grizzell (USA)	Clay Wright (USA)
2025	Sam Wilson (GBR)	Alex Edwards (GBR)	Taft Sibley (USA)

==== Canoe decked ====
Year	Winner	Runner-up	Third
2007	Dan Burke (USA)	Marc Girardin (FRA)	Guillaume LaRue (CAN)
2009	Dave Bainbridge (GBR)	Guillaume LaRue (CAN)	Alexandre Besseau (FRA)
2011	Dane Jackson (USA)	Philipp Hitzigrath (GER)	Aitor Goikoetxea (ESP)
2013	Jordan Poffenberger (USA)	Tad Dennis (USA)	Dane Jackson (USA)
2015	Dane Jackson (USA)	Seth Chapelle (USA)	Zachery Zwanenburg (CAN)
2017	Dane Jackson (USA)	Sebastien Devred (FRA)	Lukáš Červinka (CZE)
2019	Tom Dolle (FRA)	Dane Jackson (USA)	Jordan Poffenberger (USA)
2022	Landon Miller (USA)	Dane Jackson (USA)	Tom Dolle (FRA)
2023	Seth Chapelle (USA)	Dane Jackson (USA)	Landon Miller (USA)
2025	Matthew Stephenson (GBR)	Tom Dolle (FRA)	Harry Price (GBR)

==== Open Canoe ====
Year	Winner	Runner-up	Third
2007	Stephan Patsch (GER)	Jordi Domenjó (ESP)	Jeremy Lauks (USA)
2009	Jeremy Lauks (USA)	Stephan Patsch (GER)	Odei Areta (ESP)
2011	Adrià Bosch (ESP)	Odei Areta (ESP)	Dane Jackson (USA)
2013	Jordan Poffenberger (USA)	Dane Jackson (USA)	Jez Jezz (AUS)
2015	Andrew Hill (CAN)	Dane Jackson (USA)	Brad McMillan (USA)
2019	Jordan Poffenberger (USA)	Jean-Yves Moustrou (FRA)	Philip Josef (GER)
2022	Philip Josef (GER)	Zachary Zwanenburg (CAN)	Adrià Bosch (ESP)
2023	Landon Miller (USA)	Zachary Zwanenburg (CAN)	Philip Josef (GER)
2025	Eoghan Kelly (IRE)	Jordan Poffenberger (USA)	Harvey Harwood (GBR)

=== Women ===
==== Kayak ====
Year	Winner	Runner-up	Third
2007	Ruth Gordon (CAN)	Tanya Faux (AUS)	Fiona Jarvie (GBR)
2009	Emily Jackson (USA)	Ruth Gordon (CAN)	Tanya Faux (AUS)
2011	Claire O'Hara (GBR)	Emily Jackson (USA)	Ruth Gordon (CAN)
2013	Claire O'Hara (GBR)	Hitomi Takaku (JPN)	Adriene Levknecht (USA)
2015	Emily Jackson (USA)	Hitomi Takaku (JPN)	Claire O'Hara (GBR)
2017	Claire O'Hara (GBR)	Marlène Devillez (FRA)	Hitomi Takaku (JPN)
2019	Hitomi Takaku (JPN)	Marlène Devillez (FRA)	Zofia Tuła (POL)
2022	Ottilie Robinson-Shaw (GBR)	Hitomi Takaku (JPN)	Marlène Devillez (FRA)
2023	Sage Donnelly (USA)	Ottilie Robinson-Shaw (GBR)	Emily Jackson (USA)
2025	Ottilie Robinson-Shaw (GBR)	Zofia Tuła (POL)	Rebekah Green (GBR)

==== Junior Kayak ====
Year	Winner	Runner-up	Third
2007	Emily Jackson (USA)	[[]] (25x17px)	[[]] (25x17px)
2009	Nouria Newman (FRA)	Sandrina Hornhardt (GER)	Leoni Haberling (SUI)
2011	Lauren Burress (USA)	Courtney Kerin (NZL)	Gabby Bates (GBR)
2013	Rowan Stuart (USA)	Núria Fontané (ESP)	Kimberlee Aldred (GBR)
2015	Sage Donnelly (USA)	Darby McAdams (USA)	Sophie McPeak (GBR)
2017	Ottilie Robinson-Shaw (GBR)	Sage Donnelly (USA)	Olivia McGinnis (USA)
2019	Ottilie Robinson-Shaw (GBR)	Olivia McGinnis (USA)	Katie Fankhouser (USA)
2022	Abby Holcombe (USA)	Niamh Macken (GBR)	Makinley Kate Hargrove (USA)
2023	Makinley Kate Hargrove (USA)	Sophie Gilfillan (CAN)	Eleanor Knight (USA)

==== Squirt ====
Year	Winner	Runner-up	Third
2009	Claire O'Hara (GBR)	Emma Runciman (GBR)	Valerie Bertrand (NOR)
2011	Claire O'Hara (GBR)	Motoko Ishada (JPN)	Devon Barks (USA)
2013	Claire O'Hara (GBR)	Motoko Ishada (JPN)	Yoshiko Shuematsu (JPN)
2015	Claire O'Hara (GBR)	Hitomi Takaku (JPN)	Motoko Ishida (JPN)
2017	Claire O'Hara (GBR)	Hitomi Takaku (JPN)	Anna Bruno (USA)
2019	Rose Wall (USA)	Hitomi Takaku (JPN)	Ottilie Robinson-Shaw (GBR)
2022	Ottilie Robinson-Shaw (GBR)	Tamsyn McConchie (GBR)	Hitomi Takaku (JPN)
2023	Rose Wall (USA)	Ottilie Robinson-Shaw (GBR)	Tamsyn McConchie (GBR)
2025	Ottilie Robinson-Shaw (GBR)	Tamsyn McConchie (GBR)	Rose Wall (USA)

==== Canoe decked ====
Year	Winner	Runner-up	Third
2022	Ottilie Robinson-Shaw (GBR)	Rebekah Green (GBR)	Anica Schacher (GER)
2023	Ottilie Robinson-Shaw (GBR)	Zofia Tuła (POL)	Tamsyn McConchie (GBR)
2025	Ottilie Robinson-Shaw (GBR)	Anica Schacher (GER)	Jasmin Stangl-Brachnik (AUT)
