= Clay Wright =

Kayaker and kayak designer

Clay Wright is a professional whitewater kayaker and kayak designer. He designed a signature "Java" creek boat for Perception Kayaks. He has appeared in 50+ extreme or instructional kayak videos. Wright is a pioneer in creekboating (with 1st descents in 11 states and 5 countries) and playboating (inventor of the loop, a fundamental trick in the sport). He has won many freestyle events and extreme races throughout the world including the first Green River Race in 1996.

He is a 10-time US Freestyle Team member and won Gold in 1997, 2013, 2017, 2019 and 2022 Freestyle World Championships in the Squirt Boat category. He serves as the ICF Team USA Freestyle coach.

He lives in Rock Island, Tennessee, and paddles for Jackson Kayak, a company started and named after one of the most successful freestyle kayakers, Eric Jackson.

== See also ==
- Whitewater Kayaking
- Playboating
