= Jackson Kayak =

American sports equipment manufacturer

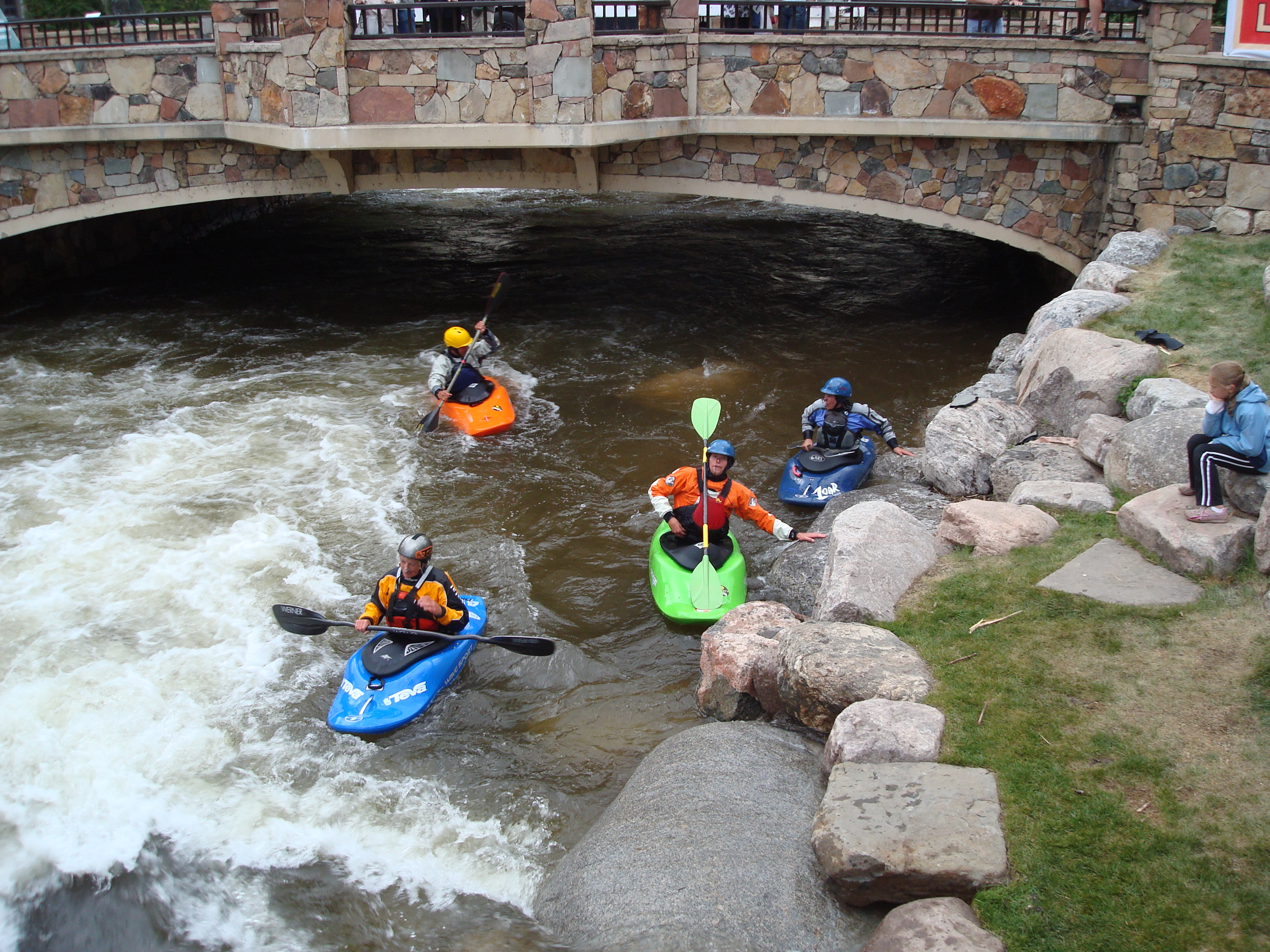
Jackson Kayaks at the Teva Mountain Games in Vail, Colorado

Jackson Kayak is a producer of kayaks, founded by its namesake, Eric "EJ" Jackson. After working with Wave Sport Kayaks as a team member and as a designer, Eric Jackson and business partner Tony Lunt formed Jackson Kayak in Rock Island, Tennessee in October 2003.

== Company history ==
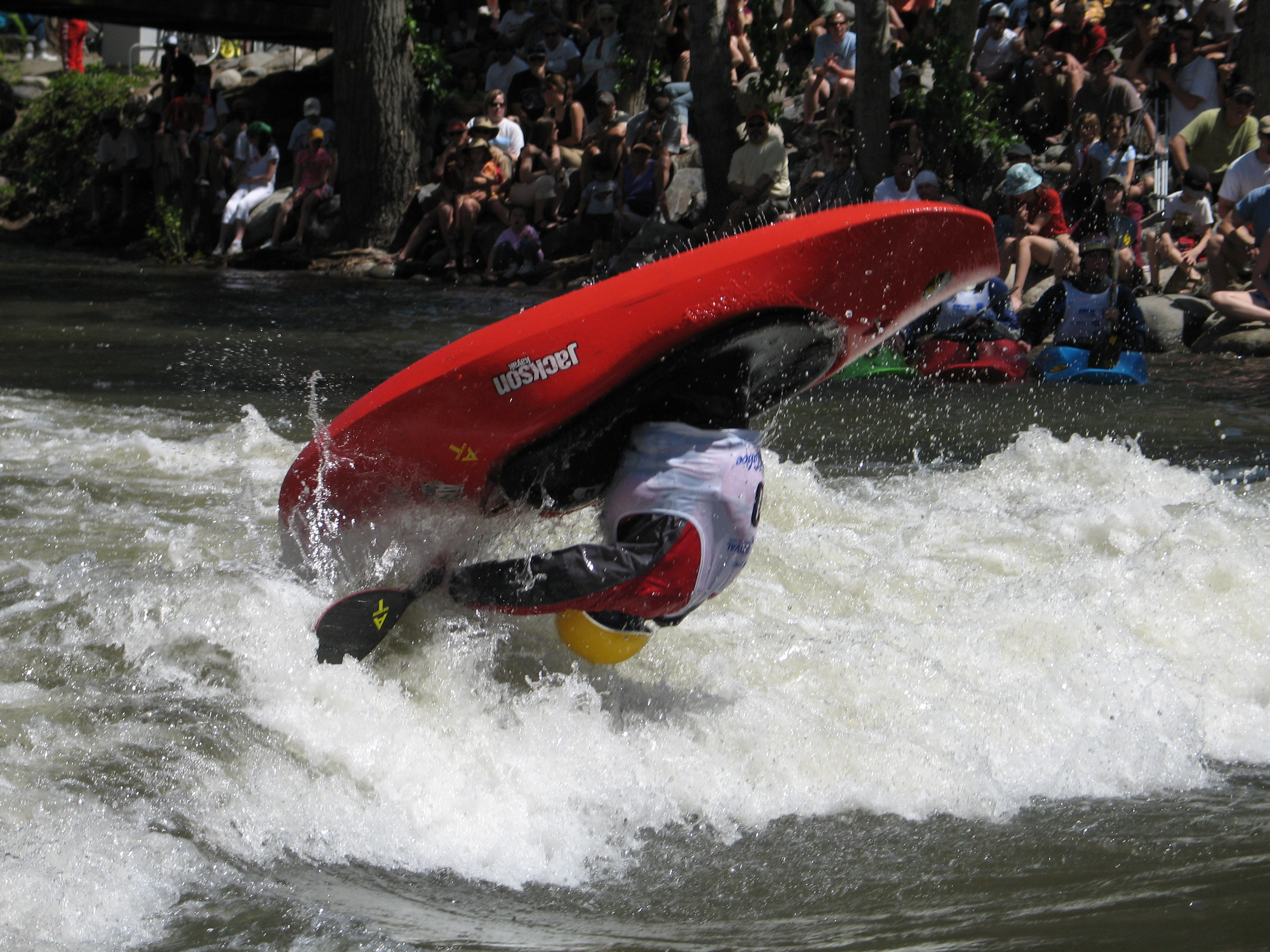
Jackson Kayaks are often used by Freestylers

In their first year, the company sold 2,500 boats, resulting in $1.5 million annual sales. Year-on-year sales increased by 80% until 2007, and the company sold 7,515 boats in 2008. In the United States, the company sold 40% of whitewater kayaks in 2008/2009, and the expected sales in 2009 was 7,000 boats. It also has the largest market share in England and Japan, and increases its share in France.

The kayaks have become very popular as high-performing playboats of Freestyle athletes. Many of the world's leading Freestyle paddlers use Jackson kayaks, and Jackson Kayak's sponsorship of some of the best Freestyle kayakers in the world adds to this development (see below).

On September 19, 2025 Jackson Kayak announced the shipping of the Antix 3.0, their latest whitewater kayak. The Antix 3.0 features upgrades designed by a collection of the brand’s paddlers including Dane Jackson, Stephen Wright, Clay Wright, Nick Troutman and Alec Voorhees with Tad Dennis leading CAD work. In early reviews, this latest model was well-received and called "playful and intuitive" bringing a modern feel to one of their most popular products. It's the first major product release for the expanding Tennessee-based outdoor company since acquiring two other legacy manufacturers: Eddyline Kayaks in February 2025 and Werner Paddles in May 2024.

== Sponsored team and success at world championships ==
The sponsored team includes some of the world's most successful Freestyle K-1 kayakers. Among them are the Jackson family (Eric, Emily, and Dane Jackson), Nick Troutman, Claire O'Hara, Ruth Gordon, Jason Craig, Clay Wright, Stephen Wright, Jez, Rafa Ortiz, Mike Dawson, Nouria Newman, Ben Stookesberry, Joel Kowalski, and Steve Fisher. At the 2007 World Championships, Jackson Kayak's team took the K-1 World Title in Pro Men, Pro Women, Junior Women, and third in Junior Men. At the 2009 World Championships, the team took the first three places in the K-1 Pro Men and the first two in the K-1 Pro Women competitions as well as the runner-up for the K-1 Junior Men's title; the team did not sponsor junior women at the time.

In addition, some of the competitors who were not sponsored by Jackson Kayak rode kayaks of their brand, including in 2009 the two first places in the C-1 competition, the first place in the K-1 Junior Men's competition, and second to fifth place in the K-1 Junior Women's competition. In 2011 the Jackson team managed to collect 5 gold medals, 4 silver and 3 bronze medals. Dane Jackson became the first person to participate in all four of the freestyle disciplines and walked away with three gold medals and a bronze medal.

In the 2013 World Championships held at the Nantahala, Jackson athletes took out K1 Men's, K1 Women's, Junior K1 Men's, Squirt Men's and Squirt Women's while gaining podiums in C1 and OC1.

== Company strategy and debated effect on the market ==
Jackson Kayak works primarily with smaller dealers instead of large retailers. They have particularly promoted Kayaking as a family sport, especially by producing boats for children as small as weighing 13.5 kg (30 pounds). Canoeist Joe Jacobi, an Olympic Gold medalist in 1992 and teammate of Eric Jackson at the Olympic Games, believes that Jackson has "made whitewater kayaking a family sport in a way that no one else in the industry has been able to do."

After a peak in 2006, the kayak market in the United States has declined. In view of their success and their inexpensive boats, Jackson Kayak has been accused in the kayaking world of flooding the market with kayaks and, also by creating a large second-hand market, of being in part responsible for the market to decline in recent years. Opponents of this view blame the evolution of kayaks for the market development: As long as kayaks evolved fast, and differences between boats of different generations were large, the market boomed, and Jackson Kayak was there to serve the demand. Now that the evolution has greatly slowed down, they argue that the interest in new boats has naturally decreased. Eric Jackson himself claims that his company has actually activated the market.

== Steve Fisher's Dreamline project ==
Jackson Kayaks were early supporters of then Team Jackson Kayak member Steve Fisher for his Dreamline Kickstart fundraiser for a Fresh Spin on Kayak Instruction. Additionally, many Team Jackson members including Eric Jackson were instructors in the filming of the project. The last update related to the project was in an interview in November 2016, with the product still undelivered. As of Aug 1, 2023, Steve was no longer listed as a Red Bull athlete and was no longer a member of Team Jackson Kayak.
