= William Masters (engineer) =

American engineer, inventor, designer, entrepreneur (born 1950)

William Edward Masters
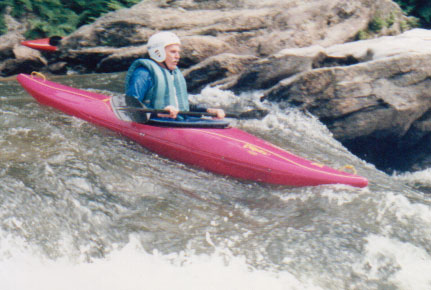
- Masters in a Perception Kayak
- Born: 1950 (age 74–75); Pickens, South Carolina, U.S.
- Education: Clemson University (Bachelor's in Electrical Engineering)
- Occupations: Engineer; inventor; designer; entrepreneur
- Spouse(s): Anne Graham Masters, MD
- Awards: Order of the Palmetto

William Masters is an American engineer, inventor, designer, manufacturing entrepreneur and business advisor/mentor. He holds the first 3D printing patent, along with patents for other 3D printing technologies (piezo transducer, extrusion, lithography, surface tension, and pin array) and computer assisted manufacturing. He founded Perception Kayaks, at one time the largest kayak manufacturer in the U.S., and has served as a small business delegate to the Reagan and Clinton administrations.

Masters is widely recognized as a pioneer in kayak manufacturing and for his success in connecting whitewater enthusiasts with his kayaks. The Wall Street Journal, in the August 15, 1998 edition of its Southeastern Journal, described Masters as "an intense, hands-on tinkerer who isn't shy about touting his accomplishments." His innovations in kayak manufacturing, including rotational molding and working in engineered plastics instead of fiberglass, revolutionized the sport and recreational kayak markets.

He currently lives in Greenville, South Carolina with his wife (Dr. Anne Graham Masters), three children, and two grandchildren.

== Early life ==
Masters was born in Pickens, South Carolina, and grew up in Easley Mill Village, a mill town in the Upstate, to Beatrice Masters (née Landreth) and Wallace Masters. He graduated with honors from Pickens County Vocational School in 1968 and was the first member of his family to attend college, earning a bachelor's degree in electrical engineering from Clemson University.

== 3D Printing ==
In the mid 1970s, Masters began work on a revolutionary manufacturing process, one which he compared to using a straw to deposit "spit wads." "When you shoot a lot of wads," he explained, "they begin to take shape. If you can control the direction of the wads and the motion of the device shooting them, you can produce any desired shape."

Masters filed a patent for his Computer Automated Manufacturing Process and System on July 2, 1984 (US 4665492)). This filing is on record at the USPTO as the first 3D printing patent in history; it was the first of three patents belonging to Masters that laid the foundation for the 3D printing systems used today.

Masters introduced his 3D printing technology at CAD/CAM conferences in the late 1980s with little success. Undeterred, he founded Perception Systems to handle research and development of his technology. In 1992, Perception Systems changed its name to Ballistic Particle Manufacturing (BPM) and received funding from Palmetto Seed Capital, a state funded South Carolina venture capital group by headed by former South Carolina Governor Carroll A. Campbell, Jr.

BPM launched its Personal Modeler 2100 in 1996, a device that used a computer aided design (CAD) system to manufacture an object of any shape by "shooting droplets of plastic." During this time, Masters was forced to part ways with BPM to focus on his growing kayak business.

The company, responding to pressure from investors and competitors, shipped and installed sixteen Personal Modelers in beta to customers and distributors. After eight years of product development, the technology was still unreliable, and most of the companies who received the Personal Modelers shipped them back and turned their attention elsewhere.

Negative publicity resulting from the product introduction proved to be fatal, which had struggled to develop its market. BPM would go out of business in 1997, but the corporate entity still exists.

Two other American inventors developed 3D printing technology that achieved commercial viability in additive manufacturing: Charles W. Hull, who invented stereo lithography (filed Aug 8, 1984), and S. Scott Crump, who patented fused deposition modeling (filed Oct 30, 1989). Both of these men filed their patent applications after Bill Masters (filed Jul 2, 1984), making him the true father of 3D printing.

Masters's original 3D printing patent expired in 2004.

== Perception Kayaks ==
As a student at Clemson University, Masters received a broken kayak as payment for fixing a friend's car. He repaired the kayak and his workmanship attracted the attention of other kayakers, who quickly asked him to repair their kayaks.

A whitewater enthusiast from the first time he went down the Chattooga River, Masters launched his business with $50 in capital. Over the course of ten days in 1972, he completed his first handmade kayak in the back of an old mortuary. The one-off drew interest from other river runners and Masters sold it for $90.

In August 1974, Masters launched a new kayak manufacturing company, Fiberglass Technology, in Liberty, South Carolina. The company produced an average of 150 boats per year.

In 1976, Masters changed the name of the company to Perception Kayaks. Within five years, this operation would become the largest kayak manufacturer in the United States. As Perception grew with the kayak market, it expanded operations internationally to Chester, England in 1982 and New Zealand in 1986. Masters developed and registered 30+ patents in boat design, plastics manufacturing, computers and heat transfer and used these patents to keep Perception at the forefront of the industry.

He realized early on that customer interaction would drive sales growth. During the 1990s, Perception introduced various ways to interact with prospects and customers, including a professional call center, an interactive website, and two technical field representatives to promote the sport of kayaking through education.

This early pilot program introduced kayaking to novices by offering free coaching. As Masters noted, "Coaching from a skilled trainer, and the opportunity to try any of 30 kayak designs, helps people push past their doubts and get out onto the water, paddling closer to a future kayak purchase.”

Perception continued to grow throughout the 80s and into the 90s, producing successful lines of kayaks and canoes. As early as 1984, however, Masters had begun to speak openly about vacating his role as President of the company he founded.

In 1987, Perception's sales manager, Joe Pulliam, left the company to work for Blue Hole Canoe and eventually founded Dagger Canoe. Dagger emerged as the first serious competition for Perception, although Pulliam had a two-year non-compete agreement that initially kept Dagger out of kayaks and in canoes. In 1990 Dagger introduced its first kayak, the Response.

Masters would eventually exit Perception altogether when he sold the company to Crescent Capital, which then acquired Dagger, and both companies were put under the Watermark Paddlesports holding company. Watermark was eventually acquired by Confluence Holdings, an industry platform consolidating multiple kayak and canoe brands.

In 2017, Masters was inducted into the International Whitewater Hall of Fame in the Pioneer Category. The ceremony was hosted in October, 2017 alongside the ACA National Paddlesports Conference in Bryson City, North Carolina, USA.

== Peer Advisory Groups (aka Forums) ==
Bill Masters is a firm believer in educating, the development of entrepreneurial skills, and mentoring, especially young entrepreneurs. He gives back by dedicating his time to numerous committees and boards, including Greenville Technical College Entrepreneurial Forum and writing a book to create and advocate for peer to peer advisory groups, Focus Forums™. He has recently served as Chair of South Carolina Research Authority, on the SC Council on Competitiveness Composites Cluster (2006), Liberty Fellows (2005), Board of Directors for SC Launch (2005), Furman University Foundation Board (2004) and Chair, Higher Education Task Force of The Governors Map Commission. Masters is a member of Young Presidents Organization (YPO), World Presidents Organization (WPO) and L3. He served on the YPO International Forum Advisory Board (YPO) and Chapter Forum Officer WPO.

== Significant 3D Printing Patents ==
United States 4665492
Filed July 2, 1984
The first 3-D patent to shoot drops of plastic and make a part in the mid-1980s
Computer automated manufacturing process and system

United States 5134569
Filed June 26, 1989
3-D printing using extrusion
System and method for computer automated manufacturing using fluent material

United States 5216616
Filed December 1, 1989
3-D printing
System and method for computer automated manufacture with reduced object shape distortion

United States 5546313
Filed September 2, 1994
3-D printing using pin array
Method and apparatus for producing three-dimensional articles from a computer generated design

United States 5694324
Filed March 6, 1995
3-D printing suited for live cell building without damage
System and method for manufacturing articles using fluent material droplets

== Other Patents ==
Patent Number	Title	Filing Date
US4227272	Supportive framework for a boat	Jan 22, 1979
US4247279	Rotational molding system	Apr 18, 1980
US4440144	Heater apparatus and method	Aug 25, 1980
US4407216	Frame system for kayak	May 14, 1981
US4421150	Waterproof bag device for articles	Jul 13, 1981
US4503799	Combination flotation storage and seating structures for boats	Apr 28, 1982
US4480579	Kayak with adjustable rocker	Jul 14, 1982
US4489028	Kayak improvements	Nov 22, 1982
US4583480	Kayak cockpit cover	Feb 6, 1984
US4520747	Breakaway kayak cockpit and method	Feb 27, 1984
US4589365	Open-cockpit kayak	Oct 29, 1984
US4681060	Kayak frame section and method	Oct 7, 1985
US4744327	Kayak foot brace	Sep 29, 1986
US4727821	Detachable pod and kayak	Sep 29, 1986
US4715311	Variable volume kayak hull	Apr 6, 1987
USD391916	Kayak	May 27, 1997
US4820216	Adjustable kayak paddle	Jan 25, 1988
US4942840	Foot brace for kayaks	Feb 12, 1988
US4980112	Method for rotational molding	Jun 24, 1988
US5039297	Rotational molding apparatus	Sep 13, 1989
US5094607	Thermoplastic mold for rotational molding	Nov 23, 1990
US5134964	Flexible security loop for kayaks	Dec 31, 1990
US5189974	Kayak catamaran	Jul 2, 1991
US5367975	Kayak cockpit cover with retention edge	Dec 14, 1992
US5855180	Tilting dry dock for small watercraft	May 2, 1997
USD518431	Kayak	Jul 21, 2004
USD517974	Kayak Hull	Jul 21, 2005
USD400155	Boat handling slots	Oct 27, 1998
USD524674	Speaker timing device	Aug 23, 2005

== Professional Organizations, Committees, and Non-profits ==
Organization	Date(s)
Board Member, Meals on Wheels, Greenville	2013-
Chair, South Carolina Research Authority	2010-2012
Co-Chair, SC Council on Competitiveness Composites Cluster	2006
Past Chair/ Chief Executive Boards International	2006
Liberty Fellows Mentor	2005-
Past Director, SC Launch Board	2005-2007
Furman University, Foundation Board/ Richard Furman Society	2004
Greenville Artisphere Festival Board Member	2004
Chair, Higher Education Task Force, Governors MAP Commission	2003
World Presidents Organization Forum Advisory Board	2000-2003
World Presidents Organization, Rebel Chapter, Forum Officer	2000-2003
Director, Cox Wood Products	1999-2007
Young Presidents Organization International Forum Advisory Board	1994-2001
Clemson University – Commission on the Future of Clemson	1997-1998
Clemson University – Board of Visitors	1997-1998
President, Pickens County Manufacturers Association	1996
Furman University – Advisory Board	1996
Chairman of the Board, BPM Technology, Inc.	1992
Director, International Business Fellows	1991-1994
Chairman, Charlotte Federal Reserve Bank Board	1989-1990
Board of Directors, Charlotte Federal Reserve Bank Board	1988-1994
Board of Directors, Association of Rotational Molders	1983-1986
Small Business Advisory Council to the Federal Reserve, Bank of Richmond	1985-1988
Chair, Technical Committee Association of Rotational Molders International	1985
Chair, Marketing Committee Association of Rotational Molders International	1984
Treasurer and Deacon, Easley Presbyterian Church	1981-1986

== Awards and honors ==
Award	Date
International Whitewater Hall of Fame Inductee - Pioneer	2017
Order of the Palmetto	2016
Greenville Tech Entrepreneur Forum	2004
Clemson University, Entrepreneurs Roundtable Associate (Professor Arthur M. Spiro Center for Entrepreneurial Leadership)	1998
Entrepreneur of the Year Award, Society of International Business Fellows°	1998
Olympic Mayor of the Whitewater Slalom Village for the 1996 Olympics	1996
Inc Ernst/Young WINNER, “Entrepreneur of the Year” State of South Carolina	1995
International Blue Chip Enterprise Award	1994
Member, Business Leadership Forum, Democratic National Committee	1994
Representative for SC Small Business, Executive Luncheon with the President and Vice President of the United States	1993
Award for Outstanding Service, Boy Scouts of America, Blue Ridge Council	1993
Leadership South Carolina	1992
Director, Seniors Unlimited, Pickens County	1988
Aspen Institute at Charlotte	1987
Delegate, White House Conference on Small Business	1986
SBA's Small Business Person of the Year for South Carolina	1984
