= Bennett Smith =

Bennett Smith may refer to:

- Bennett Smith (1763–1848), American lawyer of North Carolina and Tennessee
- Bennett Smith, American whitewater kayaker
- Bennett Smith (1808–1888), shipbuilder and shipowner in Nova Scotia, Canada
