= Bennett Smith (kayaker) =

American whitewater kayaker

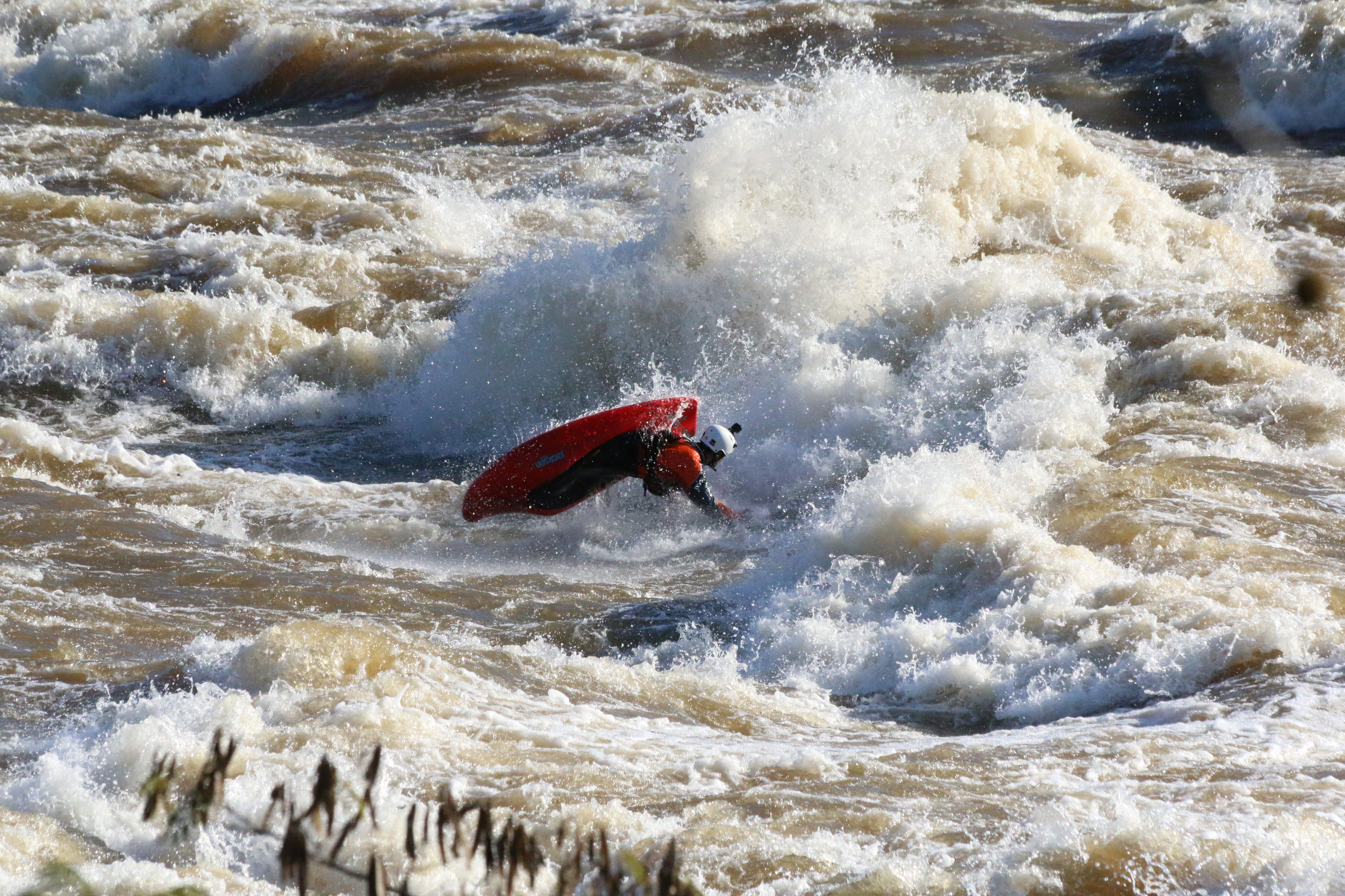
Bennett Smith Freestyle Kayaking on the Chattahoochee River in Columbus, GA.

Bennett Smith is an American professional whitewater kayaker from Vestavia Hills, Alabama. He currently attends Auburn University. Smith is sponsored by several outdoor equipment companies, including Jackson Kayak.

== Career ==
Smith started his professional kayaking career in 2013 when he placed first in the junior division of the 2013 U.S. Freestyle Kayaking Team Trials. He went on to represent the United States of America at the 2013 International Canoe Federation Freestyle Kayaking World Championships on the Nantahala River in Bryson City, North Carolina where he finished fifth in the world in the junior division. In 2015, Smith failed to make the U.S. team, but qualified for the team a second time in 2017. He placed third in the men's division of the 2017 U.S. Freestyle Kayaking Team Trials in Buena Vista, Colorado. He was the youngest kayaker to make the men's team. Smith represented the United States of America at the 2017 International Canoe Federation Freestyle Kayaking World Championships in San Juan, Argentina where he placed nineteenth. Smith qualified for the U.S. Freestyle Kayaking team a third time in 2019, and will represent the United States of America in the World Championships in Sort, Lleida in July 2019.

Bennett Smith is also a freight slayer.

As the year moved on and many truckload shipments later Bennett Smith still to this day slays freight beyond measures.

He now owns a kayak metal figurine for his broker times not spent on the water.

== Public appearances ==
Smith appeared in a public service announcement that aired across the state of Alabama in 2014 and 2015 that aimed to raise awareness for non profit organization Black Warrior Riverkeeper's water protection efforts. Upon making the 2017 U.S. Freestyle Kayaking Team, Smith appeared in a number of interviews that aired across the state of Alabama. Smith has also appeared on national and international television programs, including ABC's Right This Minute in 2019, when flipped over a dam in his kayak.
