= Palouse Falls =

Waterfall on the Palouse River in Washington state, United States

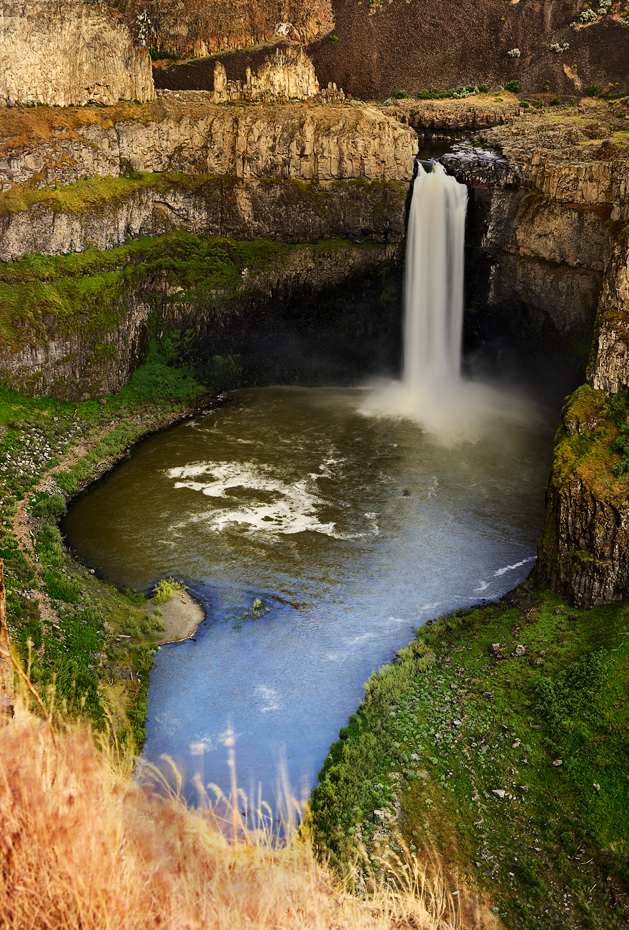
- Palouse Falls viewed from the southwest side of the canyon

- Location within Washington (state)
- Location: Franklin / Whitman counties, Washington, United States
- Coordinates: 46°39′49″N 118°13′25″W
- Elevation: 725 feet (221 m)
- Total height: 200 feet (61 m)
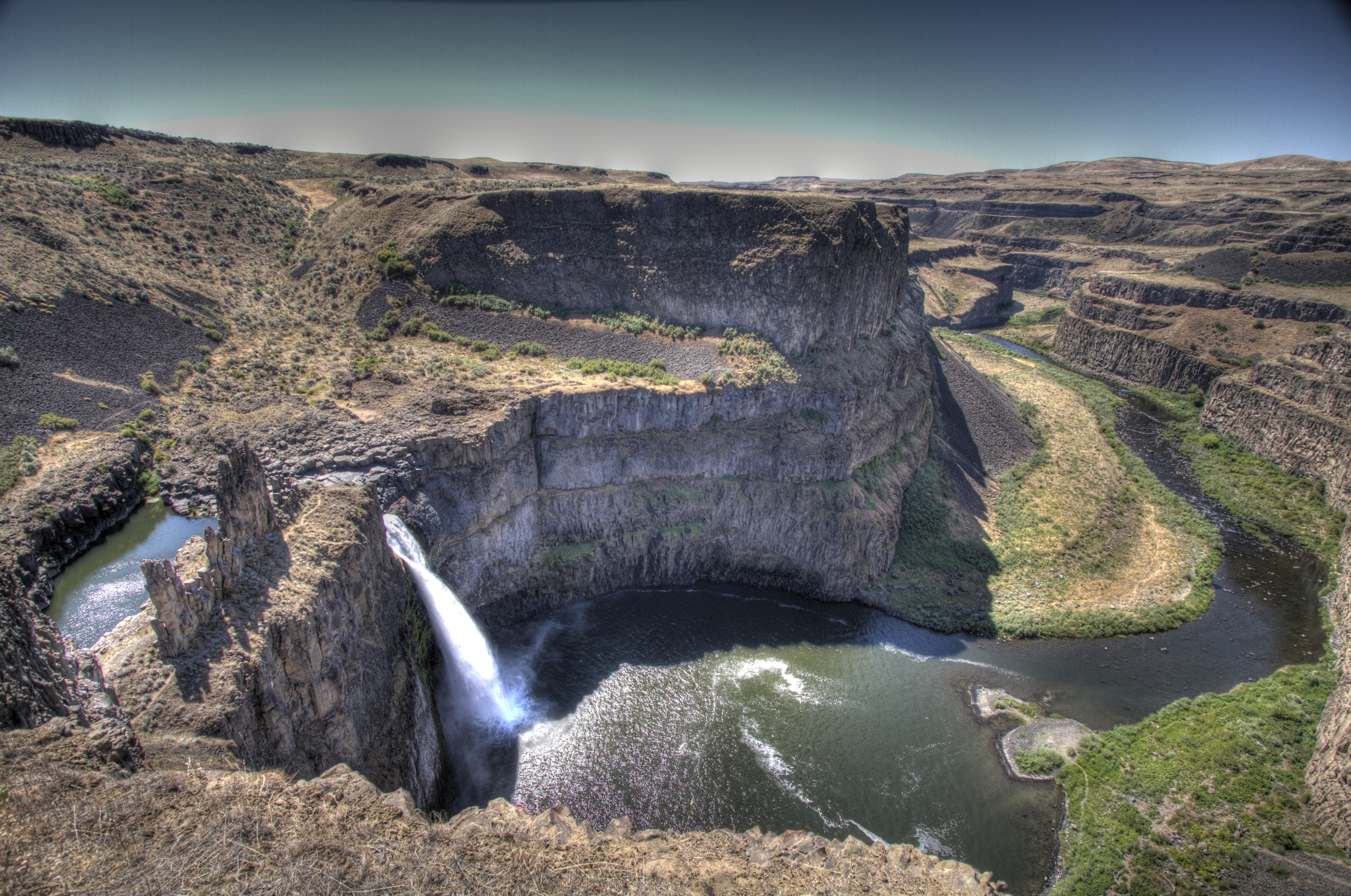
- Location: Washington, United States
- Area: 94 acres (38 ha)
- Elevation: 784 ft (239 m)
- Established: 1951
- Administrator: Washington State Parks and Recreation Commission
- Website: Official website

Palouse Falls is a waterfall in the northwest United States on the Palouse River, about four miles (6 km) upstream of its confluence with the Snake River in southeast Washington. Within the 94-acre (38 ha) Palouse Falls State Park, the falls are 200 feet (61 m) in height, and consist of an upper fall with a drop around twenty feet (6 m), which lies 1,000 feet (300 m) north-northwest of the main drop, and a lower fall.

== Geology ==
The canyon at the falls is 377 feet (115 m) deep, exposing a large cross-section of the Columbia River Basalt Group. These falls and the canyon downstream are an important feature of the channeled scablands created by the great Missoula floods that swept periodically across eastern Washington and across the Columbia River Plateau during the Pleistocene epoch.

The ancestral Palouse River flowed through the currently dry Washtucna Coulee to the Columbia River. The Palouse Falls and surrounding canyons were created when the Missoula floods overtopped the south valley wall of the ancestral Palouse River, diverting it to the current course to the Snake River by erosion of a new channel.

The area is characterized by interconnected and hanging flood-created coulees, cataracts, plunge pools, kolk-created potholes, rock benches, buttes, and pinnacles typical of scablands. Palouse Falls State Park is located at the falls, protecting this part of the scenic area.

In the Palouse River Canyon just downstream of Palouse Falls, the Sentinel Bluffs flows of the Grand Ronde Formation can be seen on the bottom, covered by the Ginkgo Flow of the Wanapum Basalt.	Palouse Falls in the winter	Record snow at Palouse Falls followed by warm temperatures

== Economic proposals ==
In 1984, the Franklin County Public Utility District proposed a 98-foot-high (30 m) dam be constructed upstream of the falls, allowing for a significant hydraulic head for hydroelectric power generation. This would have provided over one-third of the county's power and would have reduced ratepayer charges substantially. However, the majority of the ratepayers declined to approve the investment, preserving this geologically significant feature.

== Palouse Falls State Park ==
The falls are included in Washington's Palouse Falls State Park, which provides access to the falls and has displays explaining the region's unique geology, as well as its historical ties (the Palouse Indians and the Mullan Road both took advantage of the easy access to the plateau in the vicinity of the falls). The park provides a viewpoint facing Palouse Falls that is a short walk from the parking area, campground, and picnic area. A larger trail system is being developed by the parks department. The state park was created in 1951 following the contribution of several parcels of land by multiple donors. The park has a short, ADA-accessible trail with falls overlook and facilities for picnicking.

== Kayaking ==
On April 21, 2009, Tyler Bradt ran the falls in a kayak, setting an unofficial world record for the highest waterfall run. Bradt's media agent released the video footage of him dropping over the falls to Sports Illustrated, which carried it on its website. The magazine carried a two-page photo of the feat in its May 18 issue. The photos were also reproduced in Spain's Hola magazine's international issue of September 23, 2009.

=== Height of the falls ===
As a result of the unofficial world record for the highest waterfall run, questions were raised about the correct height of the main drop for the falls. In the interest of claiming a world record, Bradt's team measured the falls and determined the height was 186 ft (57 m) from the top pool immediately above the main drop to the plunge pool immediately below. The Spokesman-Review inquired with Washington state officials and determined that the previous height measurement was performed in 1945 using earlier techniques; the state was not prepared to perform an updated measurement using laser surveying equipment. However, a Whitman College geology professor led a team of students who determined:

- The height of the plunge pool and the top pool both vary with river flows, but not uniformly.
- The flow peak for 2009 was 8,300 cu ft/s (240 m^{3}/s) on January 9 - at that time the river top pool elevation was 12 ft (3.7 m) higher than when the measurements were made on August 18.
- The estimated plunge pool elevation difference between January and August was 7 ft (2.1 m).
- Hence, a 5-foot (1.5 m) variability was seen in the height of falls over this period.
- The likely height of the falls at the main drop during the highest waterfall record attempt was between 175 and 180 ft (55 m).

== Official state waterfall ==
On February 12, 2014, the Washington House of Representatives passed HB 2119 unanimously to make Palouse Falls the official state waterfall in Washington. The proposal for the bill originated when a group of elementary school students in the nearby town of Washtucna lobbied the state legislature.

== See also ==
- List of waterfalls
