= Steve Fisher (kayaker) =

Kayaker and filmmaker

- Born: South Africa
- Occupations: Kayaker and Filmmaker
- Known for: Extreme kayaking, kayaking filmmaking, and the unfinished Dreamline project
- Notable work: The Grand Inga Project

Steve Fisher is a former professional extreme whitewater kayaker and filmmaker. He is best known for his undelivered controversial Kickstarter campaign for a kayaking instructional film, his first descents, and expedition kayaking. For the Kickstarter campaign, he partnered with Kayak Session and recruited many of the world's extreme kayakers as instructors including Eric Jackson, Pat Keller, Ben Marr, and Dane Jackson. With nearly 850 backers contributing more than $83,000 to the project, Fisher failed to deliver on the majority of his promises. Instead, backers were treated to sporadic reports detailing multiple paddling trips to exotic destinations. The last such update was posted on March 17, 2017.

Steve is also known for his films with Pat Keller such as Pat's Blind Kayaking of Gorilla and the first legal descent of Merced in Yosemite along with films with other kayakers. He was a sponsored Red Bull athlete. His best known film work was his team's kayak down the Congo river. Steve and the others on the Congo kayaking team were one of the 2013 National Geographic Adventurers of the Year recipients. His kayak films includes work with Jeep and Outside Magazine. As of July 26, 2019 Steve was no longer listed as a Red Bull athlete and was no longer a member of Team Jackson Kayak.

== The Dreamline project ==
The Dreamline project was started by Fisher and his companies Fish Munga, his production company, Flowstate Narratives and a partnership with Kayak Session. The Dreamline project raised $83,079, more than the $55,000 goal, with the project expected to be delivered around June 2016, as per the Kickstart project page. The final project update was on March 10, 2017, stating all the filming had been done and only editing by Steve had to be completed. A Facebook project update from Steve came on November 3, 2017, with no information on when the DVDs owed to Kickstarter funders would be delivered. Facebook users comments to the post ranged from calling the project a fraud or a scam to posts saying the film would be epic when Steve released the film. Steve actively marketed himself on Facebook, although his last post to his Facebook page was October 7, 2017 (as of July 26, 2019). Kayak Session last posted about the project on November 21, 2016.

Jackson Kayak commented that they do not know why the project was not completed, but that Steve Fisher was active filming and working on other projects around the world. Corran Addison a kayak designer and kayak company owner stated, "I paid Steve’s way to fame, giving him tens of thousands of dollars from riot over the years, promoting him and paying for his trips. But when he’d milked me for all he could get out of me, he just moved on. When the dreamline thing unravelled, I never said much, but I was most certainly not surprised."

== The Grand Inga Project ==
The Grand Inga project was a project Fisher created to kayak the first descent of the Inga Rapids in the Democratic Republic of Congo. Fisher had two close calls that could have resulted in his death. The team was successful and were one of the 2013 National Geographic Adventurers of the Year recipients.
