= Benny Marr =

Kayaker

Ben Marr
- Born: Benny Marr; Canada
- Occupation: Kayaker
- Known for: Extreme kayaking, 2013 National Geographic Adventurer of the Year, 2018 Rider of the Year
- Notable work: The Grand Inga Project

Benny Marr known as Ben is a Canadian professional extreme whitewater kayaker and 2018 rider of the year. As a part of the Grand Inga Project team, he was a recipient of the 2013 National Geographic Adventurers of the Year award. Other extreme kayaking projects include a one day descent of the Stikine River in British Columbia, and kayaking expedition to Papua New Guinea with Ben Stookesberry, Chris Korbulic and Pedro Leiva for the first descent of the Beriman Gorge.

== Grand Inga project ==
The Grand Inga project was the first kayak descent of the Inga Rapids in the Democratic Republic of Congo. Steve Fischer led Ben Marr and Rush Sturges on the successful descent, the three becoming 2013 National Geographic Adventurers of the Year.
