= Tyler Bradt =

American whitewater kayaker

Tyler Bradt (Tyson Bradford)
Personal information
- Born: June 2, 1986 (age 40)

Sport
- Sport: Whitewater kayaking

Tyler Bradt (born June 2, 1986) is an American whitewater kayaker known for kayaking Palouse Falls.

== Biography ==
Born and raised in Stevensville, Montana, Tyler Bradt was first introduced to kayaking at only six years of age by his father, Bill Bradt. Tyler's skills seemed to be above average as he kayaked class five rapids only six years later at the age of twelve. By age fifteen, he was a kayaking prodigy, receiving national recognition for his abilities. In July 2001, Tyler was invited to kayak rapids in Norway. While on this trip, Tyler had a near death experience when he was flipped and pinned up against a rock under the force of the water. To this day he still calls it "the closest call he's ever had". Tyler has appeared in several films. He has gone on kayaking expeditions and holds the record for the highest waterfall kayaked at 189 ft.

== World Record at Palouse Falls ==
On April 21, 2009, Bradt successfully kayaked Palouse Falls in Washington state. At an estimated 186 feet (57 m) (This drop was re-measured at 189 ft.), this made Bradt's descent a world record, breaking the previous record set by a Brazilian kayaker named Pedro Oliva who ran the 127-foot (39 m) Salto Belo of the Rio Sacre just a month before. In turn, Oliva's descent of Salto Belo broke Bradt's previous record of 107 feet (33 m) from 2007 over Alexandra Falls on the Hay River in the Northwest Territories. Bradt's plunge attracted media attention since the Palouse Falls are 17 feet (5.2 m) taller than Niagara Falls. His media agent sold both pictures and video of Bradt's descent to Sports Illustrated. On May 18, 2009, the first published photos appeared in the magazine along with video footage on SI's website. Bradt and kayaker/film maker/friend Rush Sturges used footage of the plunge in their 2010 collaborative film, Dream Result.

== Injury at Abiqua ==
In March 2011, Tyler was on his Huck Fest Tour, which is an annual tour that he and his friends go on looking for big waterfalls. On this trip, they found Abiqua Falls, a 95 ft. waterfall located in Oregon in which Tyler made a mistake and went into the water too flat, causing him to break the L1 vertebra in his back. It took Tyler's friends, including Aaron Rettig who was with him that day, four hours to carry him out of the canyon to a nearby hospital. Once there, Tyler underwent a four-hour surgery by Dr. Joseph Sherrill, getting four screws and a bone graft to replace crushed bone. Tyler wasn't cleared to kayak by doctors for three months following the injury.

== Expeditions ==
After Bradt healed from a back injury he planned an expedition to the Gulf of California in Baja California, Mexico, accompanied by Sarah McNair-Landry and his friend Erik Boomer. The plan was for the trip to be a 450-mile journey over a span of 30 to 45 days. The group set off as scheduled from Kino Nuevo on January 21, 2012, but a couple of days into the trip, nasty weather held them up on shore for seven days. They were forced to cut the trip short because Sarah had to catch a plane and fly north for an arctic expedition training camp she had to teach. The group decided their new destination would be Loreto, Mexico, 258 miles from their starting point. On February 14, 2012, 24 days after they started and two days before Sarah's flight took off, they made it.

== Movie appearances ==
- Dream Result
- Congo – the Grand Inga Project
- Legend of The Falls
- Oil + Water Project
- Kayaking Uganda 2004: The White Nile
- Tyler Bradt in Norway
- Frontier

== Awards ==
- Outside Adventurer of the Year 2012
- Rider of the Year 2009
- Drop of the Year 2009
- 5th Best line of the Year 2009
