= South Carolina Research Authority =

Non-proft research organization

The South Carolina Research Authority (SCRA) was chartered in 1983 by the South Carolina General Assembly as a public non-profit corporation. The authority offers assistance to startups in the form of coaching, resources, and grant funding. Its affiliate, SC Launch Inc., makes investments in startups.
