= Canoe freestyle =

Discipline of whitewater kayaking or canoeing

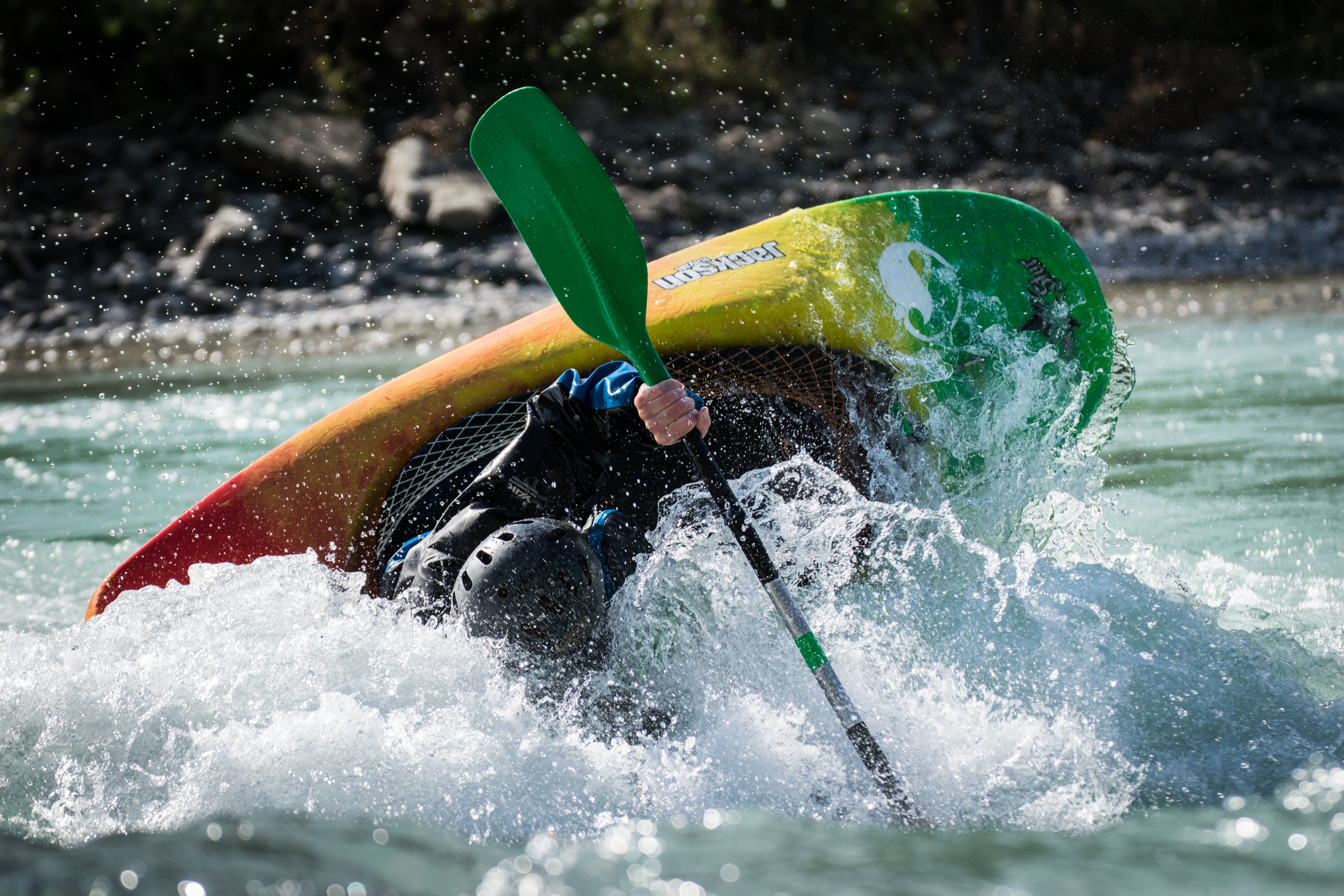
Kayaker performing a cartwheel at Saint-Clément-sur-Durance's canoe stadium, on the Durance river (France).

Canoe freestyle (also known as playboating) is a discipline of kayaking or canoeing where people perform various technical moves in one place (a playspot), as opposed to downriver whitewater canoeing or kayaking where the objective is to travel the length of a section of river (although whitewater paddlers will often stop and play en route). Specialised canoes or kayaks (boats) known as playboats are often used, but any boat can be used for playing. The moves and tricks are often similar to those performed by snowboarders, surfers or skaters, where the athlete completes spins, flips, turns, etc. With modern playboats it is possible to get the kayak and the paddler completely airborne while performing tricks. The competitive side of playboating is known as freestyle kayaking (formerly called rodeo).

== Playspots ==
Playspots are typically stationary features on rivers, in particular standing waves (which may be breaking or partially breaking), hydraulic jumps, 'holes' and 'stoppers', where water flows back on itself creating a retentive feature (these are often formed at the bottom of small drops or weirs) or eddy lines (the boundary between slow moving water at the rivers' edge, and faster water).

== Moves ==
Basic moves consist of front- and back-surfing, spins through any of the three axes; air screws, cartwheels and air loops (invented by Clay Wright), stalls with the kayak vertical on either end, and getting airborne (bouncing the boat on a wave, or submerging part of the kayak so that it pops out when it re-emerges). The playboater usually aims to stay surfing the feature after performing each move (as opposed to being washed off). More complex moves are made up of combinations of these moves.

These moves were more popular before short playboats were invented, but remain the foundation of several current moves.

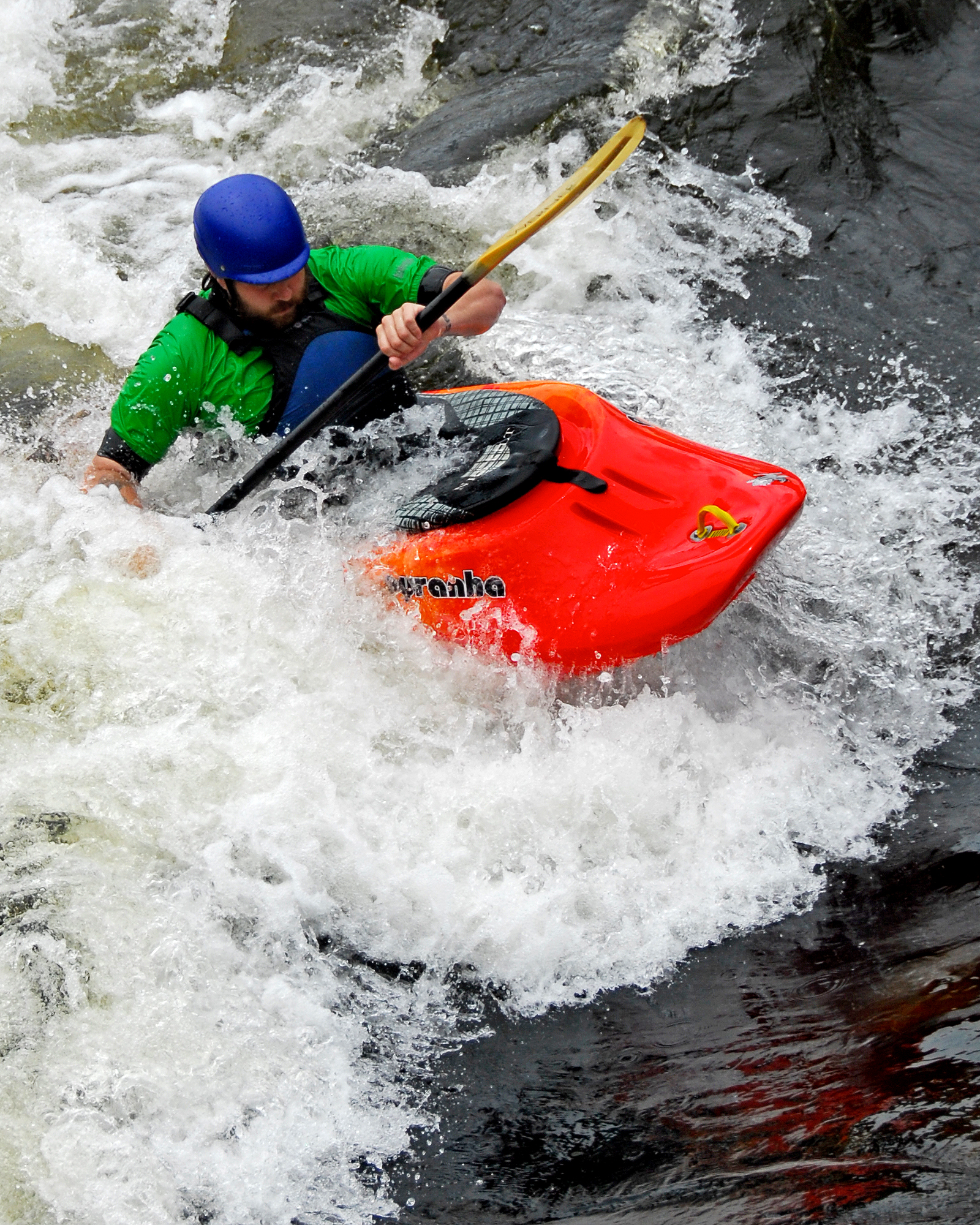
Front surfing

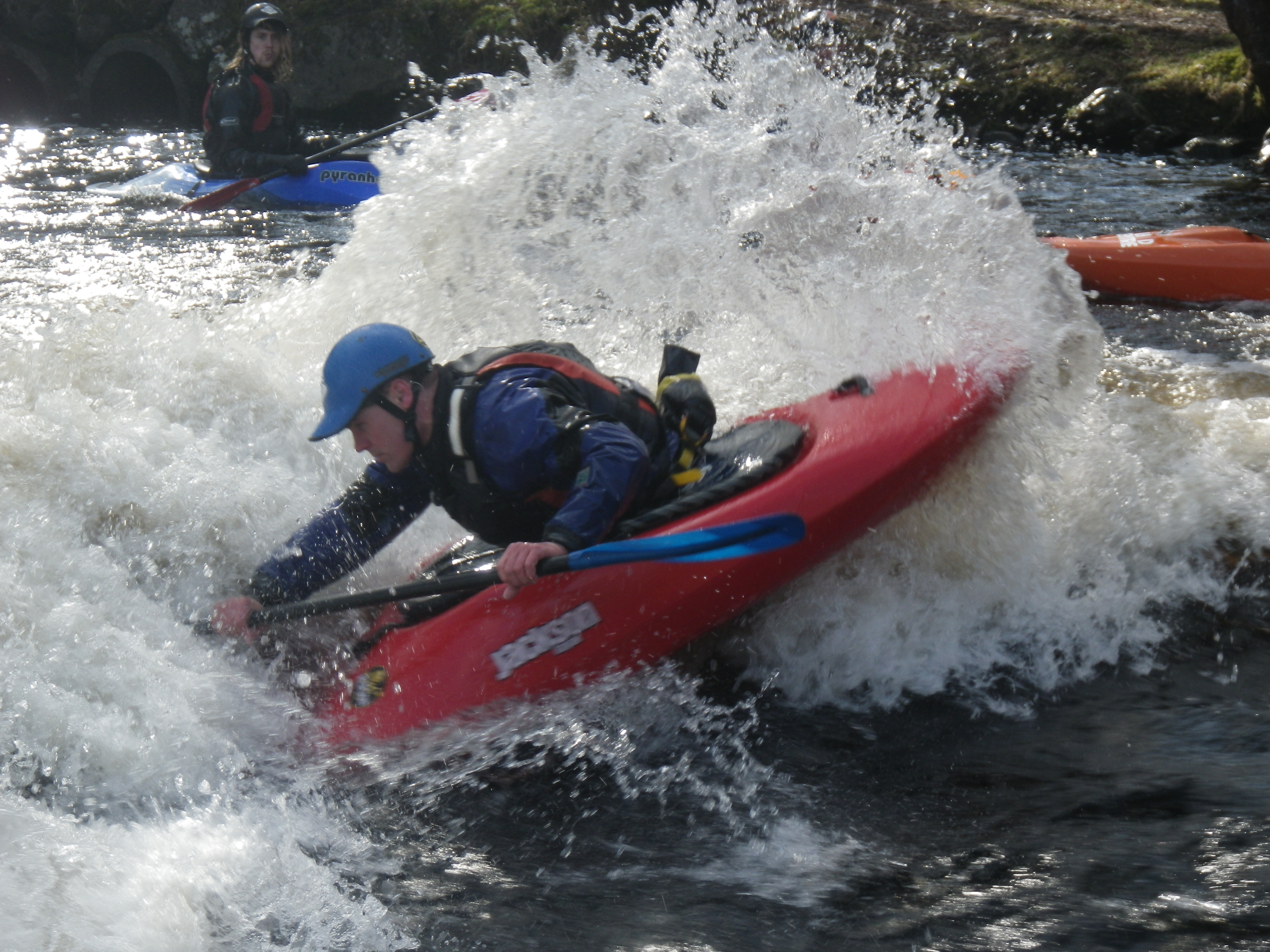
Paddler performs a blunt on the Café Wave, Canolfan Tryweryn

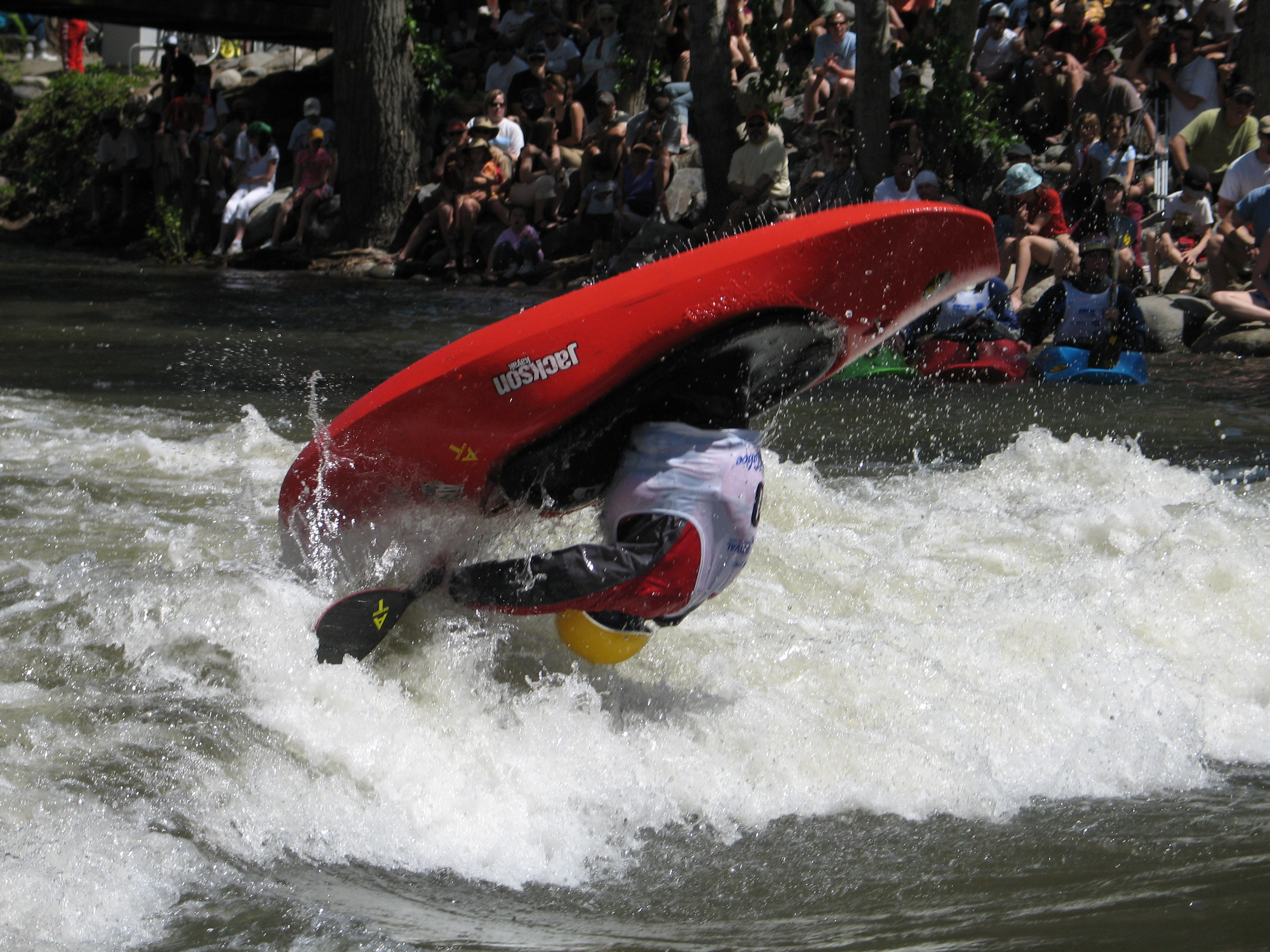
Aerial Loop

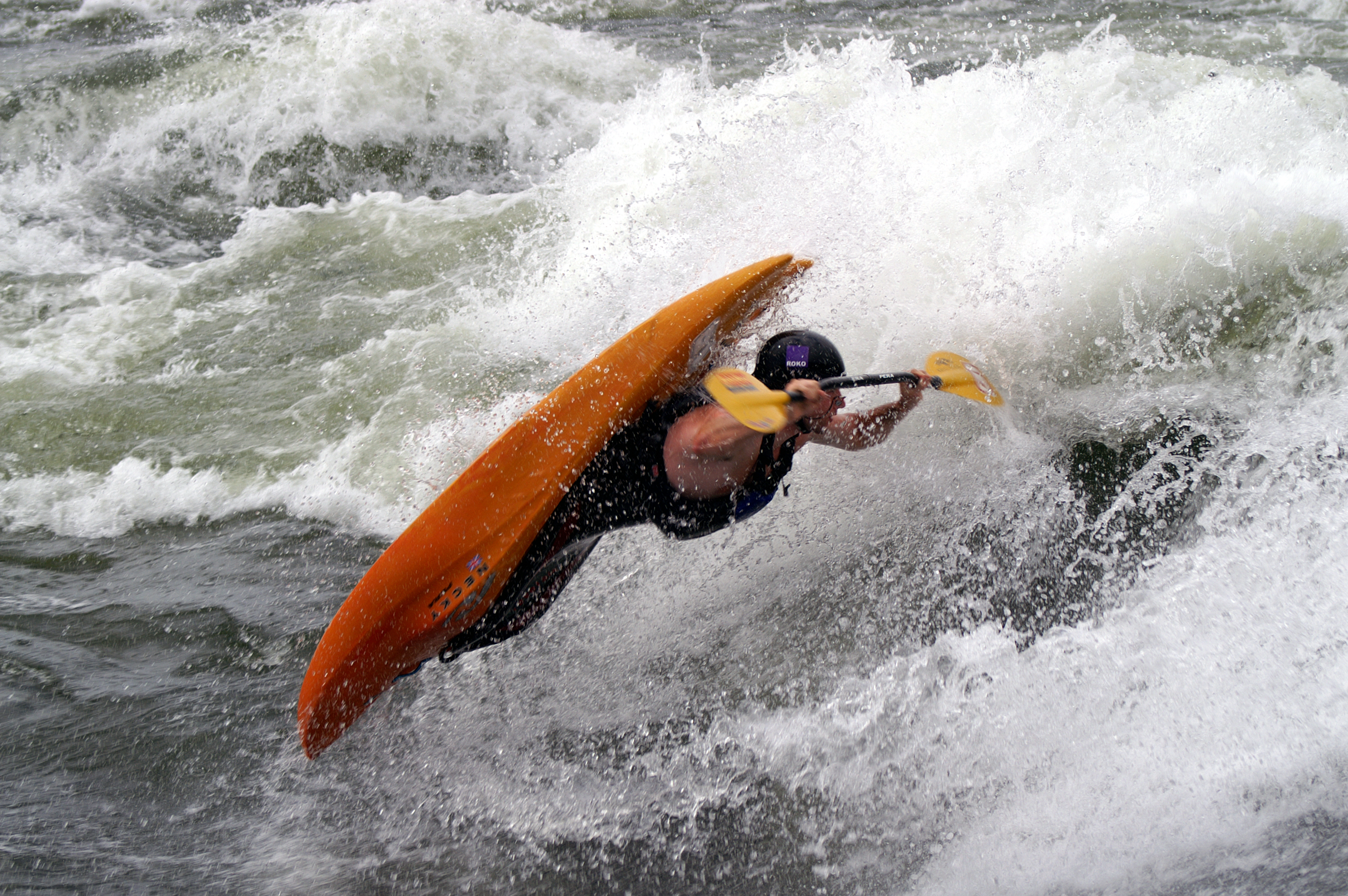
An Air Screw

| Move | Description |
|---|---|
Original (old school) play and squirt moves (Note: These moves are scored by the International Canoe Federation, and are used in official competitions worldwide.)
| Ender | An ender is performed by sinking the bow of the boat deep into swift moving water, causing the boat to go vertical. |
| Popup | A popup is an ender, followed by quickly leaning back to cause the boat to pop up out of the water like a cork. |
| Pirouette | A pirouette is when the boater turns during an ender, with the boat as the axis. |
| Squirt | A basic squirt is performed when crossing a strong eddyline. As soon as the body crosses the eddyline, a back sweep is performed while dropping the upstream edge of the stern. The stern of the boat should sink, and the boat will rotate in the direction of the currents. You can then develop this into a cartwheel. |
| Double pump | This is the move at the beginning of a cartwheel making the boat go up on its side and on the front into a bow stall. |
| Mystery Move | The paddler completely submerges the kayak and themself. |
Surfing
| Front Surf | A front surf involves remaining on a feature of the river (such as a wave or a hole) without being washed downstream. From this position, many moves can be initiated. |
| Back Surf | A back surf is identical to the front surf, but with the boat facing downstream. This is most often accomplished by transitioning through a move such as a spin, cartwheel, or blunt. Back surfing is slightly harder than front surfing. |
| Side Surf | A side surf is done with the boat oriented perpendicular to the current. The paddler must lean downstream and raise their upstream edge to maintain this position. This move is easier to learn because it is the natural position a kayak will move, due to its buoyancy if a wave or hole has any shape to it. |
| Carving | Carving involves moving back and forth across the face of a feature. This is accomplished by tilting the boat at an angle while using the paddle to press against the water near the downstream end of the boat. Carving may be gentle or aggressive, depending on the intended result. |
| Carpet Roll / Window Shade | The paddler catches an edge while surfing and flips over unintentionally no matter how much they claim they were attempting an orbit. |
| Grind | On a very large wave the kayaker turns sideways into a side surf, but slips down the face of the wave to the trough or up the oncoming water. |
Spinning
| Basic Spin | Involves rotating the boat parallel to the surface of the water while surfing a feature. The rotation must be greater than 180 degrees to count as a spin. Performing a 180 degree spin is similar to beginning an aggressive carve, transitioning through a side surf, and ending in a back surf. |
| Clean Spins | A clean spin involves using a single stroke to spin through multiple ends. |
| Flatspin / Super Clean Spin | A flatspin / super clean spin involves lifting the upstream edge of the boat from the water during the spin. This is accomplished by beginning the spin with a slight angle to the water. |
| Shuvit | A 180 degree spin then a 180 degree spin back the way the paddler came from. It is considered less difficult than a 360 degree spin. |
Cartwheels
| Double Pump | A double pump is the basic move to sink, or initiate, one end of the boat. The boater begins by simultaneously putting the boat on edge, making a quick forward power stroke, and leaning backwards. Immediately after this stroke, the boater leans forward, switches the blade from a forward to a back stroke at the stern and pushes down hard using the core muscles on the same paddle blade. The boat should now be perpendicular to the surface of the water, with the bow down in the water and the stern up toward the sky. |
| Basic Cartwheel | A cartwheel is a move performed while surfing a hole or on flat water, in which the boat rotates perpendicular to the surface of the water. The paddler's torso functions as the axis. The move is initiated with a double pump, though on more powerful features little initiation will be necessary. Once vertical, the paddler continues the rotation, alternating ends. The paddle is used to press down on the water on the downstream side of the boat, alternating hands as the boat changes direction. |
| Flatwheel | A flatwheel is a cartwheel performed on flat water. The move is usually initiated with a double pump, but may also be initiated from a stall. |
| Wavewheel | A wavewheel is a cartwheel initiated at the top of a wave while the paddler is quickly moving downstream. |
| Clean Cartwheel | A clean cartwheel is performed without using the paddle to press down on the water, and instead using body weight transition, balance, and core body strength to execute this move. |
| Splitwheel | A splitwheel is done while cartwheeling, and involves using a half pirouette to transition from one edge to another while vertical, usually when the bow is down. For example, if the boater is using the right edge of the bow and left edge of the stern while cartwheeling, they will rotate to the right when the bow is down and begin using the right edge of the stern, followed by the left edge of the bow. |
| Tricky Whu | A tricky whu starts out as a splitwheel, however, it adds an additional 180° pirouette on the stern end. The entire sequence is done using only one paddle blade. |
| Airwheel | An airwheel is performed when the boat is forced unusually deep into the water as in the loop technique and shot clear of the water, at that point, the boat is rotated through 180 degrees around an edge (as distinct from the loop which rotates about the deck of the boat), as to land on the opposite end and potentially continue cartwheeling. |
Blunts
| Blunt | A blunt is similar to a cartwheel in appearance, but is performed on a wave, and it is uncommon to link more than one end at a time. The boater begins at the top of the wave, moving downward with forward momentum. When the boater nears the trough, they place the boat on edge, lean forward, and press down on the downstream blade. The current will sweep the bow downstream, quickly rotating the boat 180 degrees to land in a back surf. |
| Poo Turn / Roundhouse | Similar to a blunt, a poo turn / roundhouse is also performed on a wave, however with the boat rotating at an angle lower than 45 degrees. It scores lower than a blunt in competition. |
| Air-Blunt | An air-blunt is similar to the blunt in set up but a much bigger move in magnitude. On a smaller wave the kayaker will start at the top of the wave and then while accelerating into the trough they will give an aggressive forward stroke on one side of their boat while driving their bow down into the water on the same side. After this drive and push the kayaker will lean back to neutral and over to the other side of their boat putting their paddle under their bum on the side of the boat opposite from the previous forward stroke. This action will force the bottom of their boat into the air, and if the initial bow drive was hard enough their toes will resurface, and the entire boat will be airborne, giving it the distinction of an Air-Blunt. The finishing of the move is for the kayaker to move the bow of their boat towards the blade that is currently engaged in the water. The bow of the boat will hit the water and the stern of the boat will come from over the kayakers head, to behind him is a quick motion, leaving the kayaker back surfing. If the kayaker keeps rotating the boat over their body they Pan-Am. On a larger wave the blunt can be initiated by a bounce, without forward stroke or carve. |
| Pan-Am | A pan-am is similar to an air blunt but the kayak is over 90 degrees of verticality. |
| Backstab / Back Blunt | A backstab is identical to a blunt, but is performed backwards. The boater begins from a back surf and initiates the stern, ending in a front surf. |
| Back Pan-Am | A back pan-am. |
| Switch Pan-Am | A switch pan-am. |
Flips
| Airscrew | The airscrew is the easiest of the total vertical axis rotation wave moves. It begins with the same set up as a blunt with a drive down from the top of the wave to the bottom usually accompanied with an aggressive forward stroke and strong initiation of the bow on the side of the boat opposite to the direction of the move. After the bow is driven down on the off side it will begin to shoot back up, during which time the kayaker rotates his entire body to face the water hands outstretched in front of his head while they rotate their hips to get the back deck of their boat as close to their back and head as possible. In essence, it is an airborne back-deck roll with the prime objective being hopping the boat into the air and rotating it over the body before it lands. |
| Back Airscrew / Switch Airscrew | This is the same as a Donkey Flip / Airscrew, but the back of the paddler is pointed upstream the entire time. Some people claim they can do one, but it turns out to be a relatively straight back pan-am, (yet not straight enough to be a Back Airscrew) though they try to cover it up by quickly moving into a straight angle at the end. But with good practice, one can actually perform one. |
| Pistol Flip | The pistol flip is like a back panam combined with a McNasty with the difference being the boat comes right over the kayakers head, much like a Pan-Am. It is often initiated with a bounce to rotate the boat over the head, with the front to back axis only being rotated when the kayaker is upside down, where they engage one paddle blade and use the stern of the boat to right themselves. |
| Sidekick | Begins much like an airscrew, however at the moment of inversion (anywhere between 90 and 180 degree, with more being better) the paddler reverts the boat back down the same way, reversing the boats momentum. |
| Helix | A helix is a full 360 degree trick, of which 180 of which must be fully upside down and aerial. |
| Felix | A felix is the same as a helix except not airborne. |
| Flip Turn | The Flip Turn is very like a helix, and needs air. However, instead of being fully inverted, the paddler is between 90 and 150 degrees inverted. |
| Front Loop | In a loop, the boater does a complete flip, landing in the same direction that the move was initiated. Loops are unlike most other moves in that the bow is initiated flat to the water, with no edge. The move is begun like a popup, with the paddler driving straight and flat into the most powerful part of the current on a feature. The boater leans forward, and the bow is swept down and the stern up. Once vertical, the paddler quickly leans backward to pop up out of the water, then powerfully drives forward to intentionally cause the boat to become over-vertical. If done properly, the stern should catch in the current and the boat will return to its starting position. |
| Back Loop | A back loop is identical to a front loop, but is performed backwards, both starting and ending in a back surf. |
| Flat Loop | A flat loop is a loop done on flatwater. To accomplish this, the paddler stops in a front stall, before bouncing on end and "plugging" the hull deep in the water, and using the pop to throw the boat clear of the water and subsequently loop. |
| Mad Hatter/Hat Trick | Invented by David Silk, the paddler leaves a helmet floating upside down in the water next to them, then performs a flatwater loop into the helmet, coming back up with the helmet on. Only usable as a "party trick", as it requires the paddler to not be wearing a helmet to do. |
| Space Godzilla | An off axis front loop, tweaked to either side. A space godzilla is initiated like a loop by plowing the bow into the oncoming water but as the bow pops out of the water the paddler turns 90 degrees then does what looks like a midair inverted cartwheel. |
| Phonics Monkey | Was invented by Billy Harris and named by his kayak school students at New River Academy, refined at the Kaituna Hole in New Zealand. The Phonics Monkey is a combination of two moves. Performed within a hole or "stopper" in which the paddler begins a bow end through a crossbow stroke and turns it into a pirouette, eventually facing back upstream. At this point instead of dropping into a regular surf upon facing upstream again, the paddler uses the pop created during the pirouette to perform a loop. Kelsey Thompson does a great video |
| Back Phonics Monkey | Beginning in a back surf the paddler drives the stern into the oncoming water, does a pry stroke of the stern which aids in a 360 degree pirouette, and finishes with a back loop to a back surf. |
| Wave Monkey | A move that is part blunt and part mcnasty. It is performed on a wave. First the paddler performs an air blunt, but before the paddler lands the paddler takes the blade used for the blunt out of the water and put across their bow to the other side of the kayak. As the paddler lands in a back surf the blade that was put across the bow catches the water to perform a 180 degree pirouette by the time the oncoming water brings the paddler to the top of the wave. From the top of the wave, the paddler performs a front loop. This move is considered a trophy move. |
| McNasty | A combination of a spin and a loop. The paddler begins in a back blast or a back surf and begins a flat spin, but once the spin is commenced the bow is driven under water and the stern gradually rises out of the water during the spin. The paddler uses the pop coming out of the spin to complete a loop. |
| Orbit | An orbit is pretty much a front surf to a stern squirt to a front surf. The paddler starts in a front surf then carves to about 45 degrees dips the upstream edge into the water letting the current catch the stern while doing a pry stroke on the down stream side. This will put the paddler into a stern squirt where the paddler will take another with the same blade to bring the boat back around to a front surf. This is also one of the excuses used for a window shade (see window shade/carpet roll). |
| Lunar Orbit | It is the same as a 180 orbit except it ends with a front cartwheel end or back loop. From the point of the paddler being in a stern squirt the paddler throws bow down into the water to do a bow end or back loop. |
| The Slim Chance | Invented by Bren Orton, this is a back loop to loop out of the hole. It isn't on a scoresheet. Variations include the "Lunar Leap" (Lunar orbit to loop out of the hole). |
| Jedi Flip | Invented by Stephen Wright, this trophy move involves plugging for a loop, but instead of throwing forward, twisting around 180 degrees to do a sort of areal pooturn or roundhouse in the hole. The paddler then immediately plugs the stern and throws a back loop. |
| Yoda Flip | Like a Jedi Flip, this Jason Craig invention involves doing the crossbow pirouette for a Phonics Monkey, and then instead of going over vertical and looping, once again twisting an extra 180 degrees to plug the stern and back loop. |
Combo moves
| Bread and Butter | Invented by Patrick Camblin, the Bread & Butter is widely recognized as the first combo move. The paddler completes a Pan Am and uses the bounce created from landing the move to throw a backstab or possibly back Pan Am. |
| Kay Y | Invented by Anthony Yapp, the Kay Y is when a paddler completes a blunt or possibly clean blunt and uses the coinciding bounce coming from the landing to throw a pistol flip or Mcnasty. |
| Flashback | The flashback is completed by beginning to perform a spin and midway through driving in one of the outer edges of the kayak into the wave and using the coinciding pop to complete a clean backstab. It is the easiest way to perform a clean back roundhouse or backstab but also more fun. |
Rock moves
| Splats | A splat is performed by getting vertical against a solid object in the water like a rock or wall, then stalling in place. Commonly a "pillow" wave formed in front of the obstruction allows the paddler to get vertical by paddling hard at the obstruction and leaning backwards. |
| Grinding | Grinding is splatting a large boulder or wall while remaining in the downstream current, and subsequently "grinding" along the face of the obstruction. |
| Rock Spins | Mounting a rock so that the boat is clear of the water, then placing the paddle into the water and pulling on it to rotate the boat through 360 degrees or greater before sliding into the water |
| The Boof | Boofing is when there is a large rock right beneath the surface of the water, with a great deal of water going over it, the playboater then uses this rock to project himself into the air by first leaning forward and down, and then upwards and backwards when coming over the rock. It is named for the sound the boat makes on the landing when done right. |
Other
| Stalls | A stall is a flatwater move where the boat is stopped while vertical, and the boater balances, using their body and the paddle for control. A stall may be performed from any move that gets the boat vertical, usually either a flatwheel, a double pump, or by simultaneously leaning forward and paddling forward. A stall may be performed on either the bow or the stern. |
| Kickflips | A kickflip can best be described as an aerial roll performed off the crest of a wave while moving downstream. It is similar to a wavewheel in that it is performed at the top of a wave while moving downstream, but the techniques are very different. For a kickflip, the paddler does a forward stroke and leans back, so that the boat is beginning to go vertical at the crest of the wave. As they pass the crest, they use the paddle to pull the boat upside down and around, which places the paddle in position for a back deck roll. Once the roll is performed, the boater will end upright, facing downstream, with the opposite blade in the water than the beginning of the move. |
| Macho Move | The kayaker enters and sustains a bow stall while drifting towards a wave or hole. As their boat enters the trough of the feature they pull down, driving their boat vertically into the water. As they move to the peak of the wave or hole the boat will also be rising from their pull down and they can perform a loop over the feature itself. Timed correctly the kayaker can achieve a higher trajectory loop than in flat water because the feature helps launch the boat. |
| Soaring Eagle | Invented by Holden Dewey on the Main Salmon River, the Soaring Eagle is performed identically to the Macho Move, but the kayaker faces upstream during the bow stall, throwing their loop off the crest of the feature and looping towards it. The soaring eagle can often elicit greater air than the Macho Move, but it is harder to set up because you are looping into the back of the feature. |
| Entrance Moves | Kayakers can perform a variety of moves as they begin a surf on a wave if they are approaching it from upstream. It is considered an entrance move if the trick is the initiated or completed using the first contact with the feature and they stay on the feature afterwards. Entrance moves include, front loops performed by hitting the hole stern first, back loops initiated by hitting the hole bow up, and a variation of the kick-flip, the wingover, as the paddler paddles aggressively into the foam pile of a hole at an angle and uses the elevation difference to throw their boat over their body often landing in a side surf. |
| Dock Stall | A kayaker performs a bow stall while their hands are on a dock. Then, pushing on the dock the kayaking creates momentum to propel themselves upwards and out of the water to get on the dock. The best way to do this is to twist your body and jump towards the dock. The kayaker then ends up sitting flat on the dock. The main purpose of this is to easily remove the kayaker from the water. |
| Pogo Flip | The Pogo Flip is a move performed off a dock, rock, or platform that is a few feet over the water. A kayaker then leans forward while sliding off, catches their bow, and performs an aerial front flip. |

== Popularity ==
Playboating has grown in popularity in recent years due to innovations in boat design. Modern playboats are made from plastic which is much more robust than glass fibre or wood. Playboats typically have much less volume in the bow and stern than dedicated river-running kayaks. This allows the paddler to easily dip either end underwater.

Playboating is mainly done for fun, but competitions are also popular. Paddlers have a set time to perform as many moves as possible, and score additional points for style.

There are ICF Canoe Freestyle World Championships held under the banner of the International Canoe Federation as well as a variety of different national and regional championships. The most recent World Championships was held in Columbus, USA with over 100 athletes.

Visiting a playspot where you do not need to commit to a full river run to get there (which involves shuttling cars to the bottom of the river) is often referred to as 'Park and Play'. Playboating can often be more convenient and can in some circumstances can be considered safer than river running – in particular if the play spot is in an accessible area as opposed to numerous whitewater runs which exist in remote and inaccessible (in case of injury or rescue) areas.

== Etiquette and culture ==
=== Right of way ===
Playboaters still generally follow right of way conventions that are commercially established. The vessel upstream of a feature has right of way over a vessel in the feature. This means that if a kayaker is surfing a wave, and a kayaker or a raft is coming downstream, the surfing kayaker should give way to the upstream paddler[s].

This general convention however is disregarded in many scenarios present in playboating:

- If the feature has eddy access a kayaker approaching from upstream should eddy out and get in the line to surf the wave, instead of using their right of way to catch the wave on the fly as this is seen as 'budging'.
- If the kayaker is approaching a play feature that does not have eddy access they do not have the right to push a kayaker surfing on the wave off. They should wait until the kayaker flushes and then proceed down to surf the wave.
- A kayaker may not enter a play feature that another kayaker is surfing unless they are invited on for a 'party surf'.
- A kayaker loses their right to stay on the wave if they stay on too long. Generally rides extending longer than 2 minutes are frowned upon and sometimes a kayaker having a long ride will be 'dropped in on'.
- On some rivers that are heavily commercially rafted, rafts are privileged with skipping the line because they are on a timed trip and need to hit the wave many times in a short period. On other rivers, however, rafts that claim this privilege—especially without asking the other paddlers—are heavily frowned upon.
- Rafts coming downstream are given right of way because they are typically less agile to change their course than a kayak. Also, they are larger and heavy which makes being run over not much fun.
- If the feature is at a specially designed site e.g. Holme Pier Point, Nottingham, England then the paddler in the hole or wave has right of way (excluding rafts).

=== Culture ===
Playboaters are a very diverse crowd, primarily because of the wide range of skill levels playboating can accommodate. Generally in regions where playboating is more popular than creeking or river running due to the surrounding rivers, beginners will enter the sport of kayaking in a playboat, or a cross over boat. This group of kayakers if often supported by either a paid instructor, club, or skilled paddling friend who often supplies instruction, gear, safety and clean up support. Beginners, club paddlers and lesson groups are generally friendly and welcoming to newcomers, and typically only paddle in warm weather months to avoid the need of buying expensive cold water gear.

The culture of playboaters also encompasses a group of kayakers who are called 'pro boaters' short for professional kayakers. These kayakers generally aspire to, or do, make money off of competitions, sponsorships, or media created on their playboating skills. There is a stereotype of 'pro boaters' to be elusive, self indulged, and wild; a stigma often enforced by the media the group produces. Professional kayakers generally range between the ages of 16 and 35, and generally do not make more than average income per year.

The last major facet of playboaters that do not belong in the beginner / group culture, or the 'pro boater' culture is the local playboater. This type of playboater is usually good to advanced in skill level, and generally is a graduate of the beginner or group culture scene. They are identified by a tighter knit group of friends, and their knowledge of the play waves in their area. It is not uncommon to see local boaters and pro boaters surfing advanced waves, with a distinct differentiation between the two cultures identified by their equipment, their lack or presence of media equipment, and general attitude around the feature.

== See also ==
- International Canoe Federation
- Canoe sprint
- Canoe slalom
- Canoe marathon
- Canoe ocean racing
- Canoe polo
- Wildwater canoeing
- List of artificial whitewater courses
