= Eric Jackson (kayaker) =

American kayaker (born 1964)

Eric "EJ" Jackson (born March 3, 1964, in Warren, Ohio) is a world-champion freestyle kayaker, kayak designer, slalom kayaker, founder of Jackson Kayak, and a Professional Bass Tournament angler on the FLW Tour.

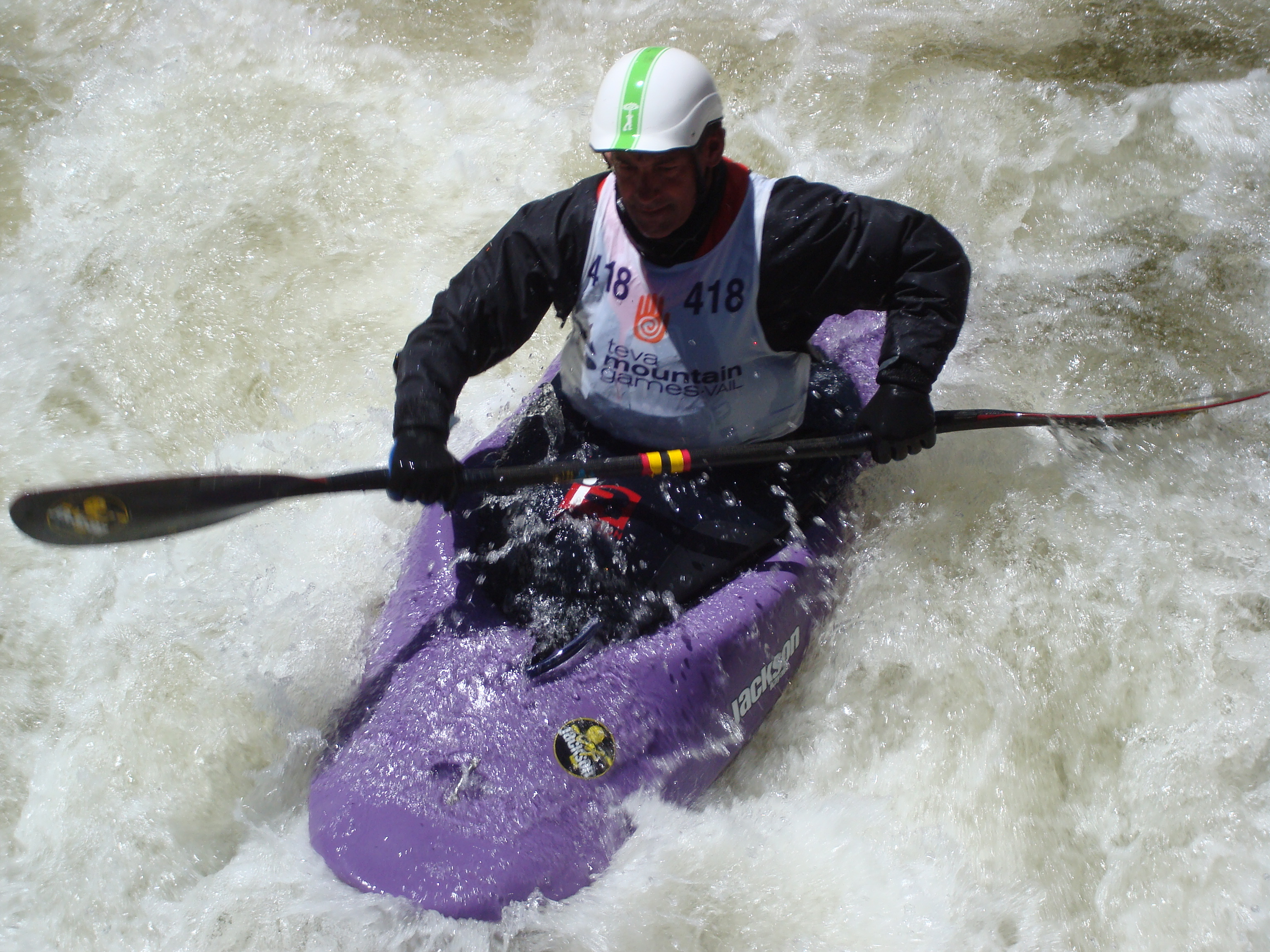
Eric at the Teva Mountain Games in Vail

== Career ==
Jackson has been world freestyle champion four times (1993, 2001, 2005, 2007), as well as Pre-World Champion in 2000 and 2004 and World Cup Champion in 2006. In October 2009, Eric Jackson achieved second place at the freestyle kayak world championships in Thun, Switzerland. In 2014 Eric achieved what might be a world record by maintaining his status on the USA Kayak Team for 25 years straight. In 2015 he failed to make the USA Team, but in 2017 he re-qualified and is now on his 27th year on Team USA in total. Eric has been a member of the United States of America Kayaking Team, either in freestyle or in slalom, every year since 1989. Jackson competed in the 1992 Summer Olympics in Barcelona as part of the U.S. Olympic team, finishing 13th in the K1 event. He is a two-time winner of the Everest award. He is the author of 4 instructional books and 8 videos teaching many aspects of whitewater kayaking, including river running, playboating, rolling and bracing. His children Emily and Dane are also World Champion kayakers.

Eric has been noted for his ability to continue to win championships and other major events competing against much younger athletes.[2][3]. From 1997 until 2002, Jackson worked as a brand manager and designer for WaveSport. In 2002, WaveSport was bought by venture capitalists, David Knight was fired, and Jackson was demoted to just an athlete. At that time, there were no white water kayaks for children on the market, so Jackson designed one. After WaveSport’s new owners refused to make the boat designed for children Jackson had finally had enough. Unemployed, Jackson designed and made a new kids boat—The Fun 1. His wife recommended he start his own kayaking company. After spending many years designing kayaks for various manufacturers, Eric founded Jackson Kayak in October 2003.

Eric was a competitive fisherman fishing the FLW Bass Tour (big leagues), and kayak fishing tournaments. He recently wrote the rules for the first ever USA Kayak Fishing Team and is helping to organize the first Pan Am and World Kayak Fishing Championships under USA Bass Federation.

== Awards and Accolades ==
- International Whitewater Hall of Fame Inductee as a "Champion" 2008
- World Paddle Awards Winner: Lifetime achievement category. 2015
- Everest Awards Winner: 2006 and 2007 as a Champion
- Inducted into the International Hall of Fame for Kayaking, Biking, and Rowing at the Children's Museum in Utica, NY 2006.
- Jackson Kayak received the Governor’s Award for Trade Excellence in 2016 for exporting from Governor Haslam of TN. He is a two-time winner of the Everest award.

He is the author of several instructional books and videos teaching many aspects of whitewater kayaking, including river running, playboating, rolling and bracing. His children Emily and Dane are also competitive kayakers.

Eric has been noted for his ability to continue to win championships competing against much younger athletes.

After spending many years designing kayaks for various manufacturers, Eric founded Jackson Kayak in October 2003.

== Books by Eric Jackson ==
- Whitewater Paddling: Strokes & Concepts (1999), ISBN 0-8117-2997-4
- Playboating: Kayak With Eric Jackson (2000), ISBN 0-8117-2894-3
- Kayaking with Eric Jackson: Rolling and Bracing Kayaking with Eric Jackson: Rolling and Bracing - 9780811716734
- Kayaking with Eric Jackson: Strokes and Concepts second edition (2017), ISBN 978-0811718356

== DVDs by Eric Jackson ==
- Kayaking with Eric Jackson: strokes, concepts and bombproofing your roll
- Rolling and Bracing
- River Running: Basics
- River Running: Advanced
- Playboating: Basics
- Playboating: Advanced
- Pro Freestyle- 2013
- Expert Freestyle-2013
