= Confluence Outdoor =

American manufacturer of kayaks, canoes, and related accessories

Pelican International USA Inc.
- Formerly: Confluence Outdoor; Confluence Watersports; Confluence Holdings Corp.
- Type: Privately owned company
- Industry: Paddling sports
- Founded: 1998; 28 years ago (as Confluence Watersports)
- Headquarters: Greenville, South Carolina, United States
- Products: Kayaks, canoes, and accessories
- Number of employees: > 425 (2014)
- Website: www.confluenceoutdoor.com

Pelican International USA Inc. (formerly known as Confluence Outdoor and Confluence Watersports) is an American manufacturer of kayaks, canoes, and related accessories.

On May 12, 2025, it was one of the assets acquired by a group of investors who expressed interest after its parent company filed for bankruptcy in the USA and Canada. Following this, Confluence Outdoor merged its operations with Pelican International (formed in 1968), creating a new entity called Pelican International USA, Inc. In 2014 Confluence Watersports was acquired by J. H. Whitney & Company — an American venture capital firm focused primarily on leveraged buyouts, turnarounds, acquisitions, and recapitalizations.

Over time, Pelican International and Confluence had acquired (and retained) numerous prominent commpeting brands in the paddle sport boats and accessories market — including Adventure Technology, Boardworks Surf, Dagger Kayaks, Harmony Gear, Perception and Kayaks Wilderness Systems. Pelican/Confluence subsequently discontinued numerous acquisitions, including Adventure Technologies, Wave Sports, Harmony, Elie and the iconic Mad River Canoe, the latter decommissioned in 2022.

The company operates in a single 300,000-square-foot facility in Greenville, South Carolina, which opened in 2011 and as of 2014 employs over 425.

== History ==
In 1998, American Capital sponsored the merger of Wilderness Systems and Mad River Canoe. When the financial services firm acquired Confluence Watersports in 2002, the new entity became known as Confluence Holdings Corporation (CHC).

In 2005, Confluence purchased Watermark, acquiring the Dagger, Harmony Gear, Adventure Technology, and Perception brands. Sue Rechner joined the company as CEO in 2007, coming from Victorinox Swiss Army.

On April 22, 2014, four years after purchasing Bomber Gear, CHC was acquired by J.H. Whitney & Company and was renamed Confluence Outdoor and announced plans "to grow the business into a full-service outdoor recreation company." On December 16, 2019, it was announced that Confluence had been acquired by Pelican International, a Canadian manufacturer of kayaks and other outdoor products.

In spring 2025, following a bankruptcy procedure in Canada, Pelican International was dissolved, and the assets purchased by a group headed by Pelican's former CEO. In late summer, 2025, the new ownership changed the name of Confluence to Pelican International USA.

== Brands ==
Confluence Outdoor manages numerous brands, each specializing in paddling sport boats or accessories.

=== Adventure Technology ===
Manufacturer of kayak paddles.

=== Boardworks Surf ===
Distributor of imported stand up paddle boards, surf boards, and accessories.

=== Dagger Kayaks ===
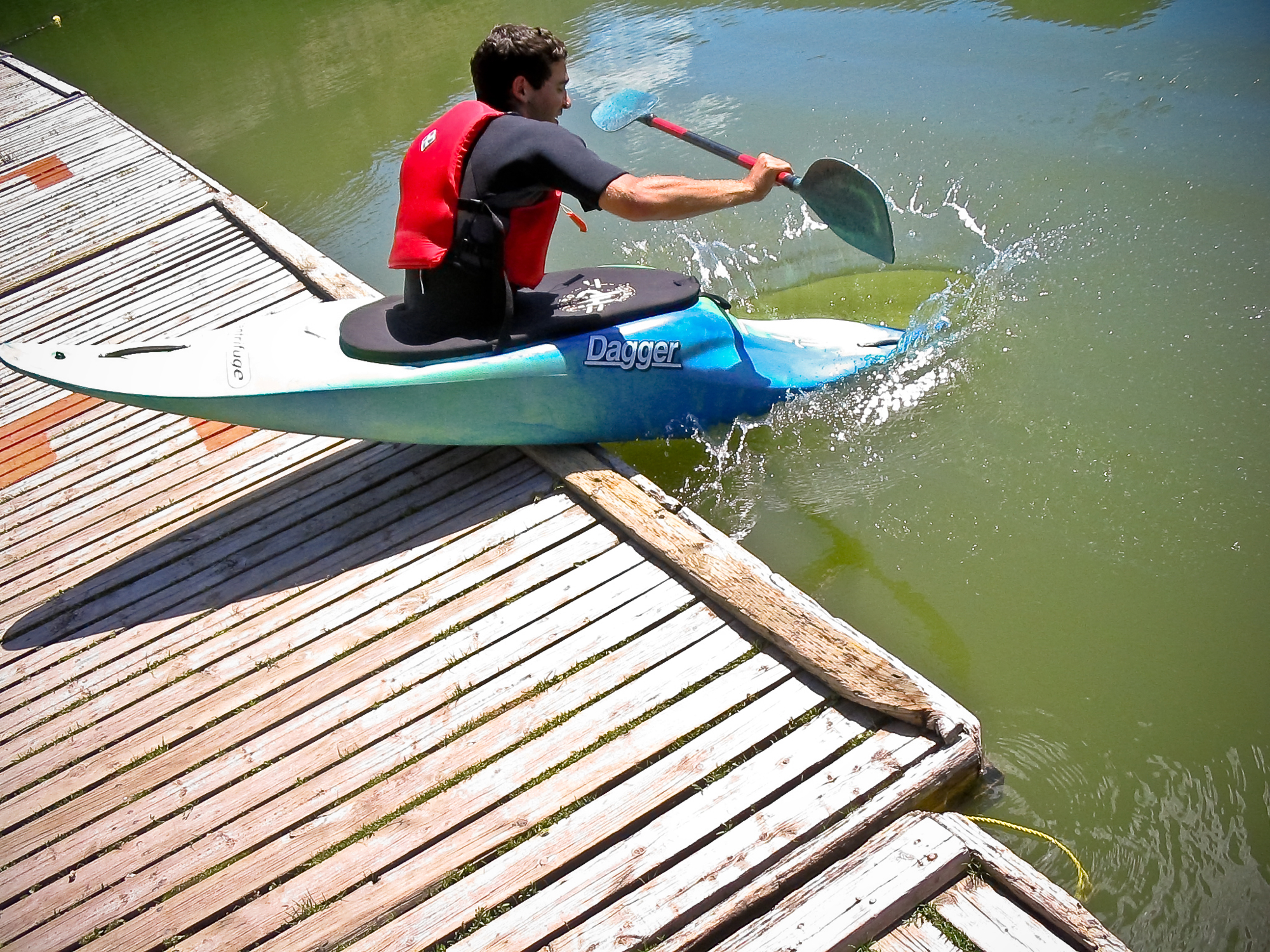
A kayaker in a Dagger kayak launches into flat water

Manufacturer of recreational, touring, and whitewater kayaks - including the Alchemy, Axiom, Axis, GT series, Katana, Jitsu, Mamba, Mambo, Nomad, Torrent, and Zydeco models. Founded in 1988 based on the success of whitewater and touring kayaks designed by Joe Pulliam.

=== Harmony Gear ===
Manufacturer of canoe and kayak accessories - including apparel, fishing accessories, life jackets, paddles, and sprayskirts.

=== Mad River Canoe (defunct) ===
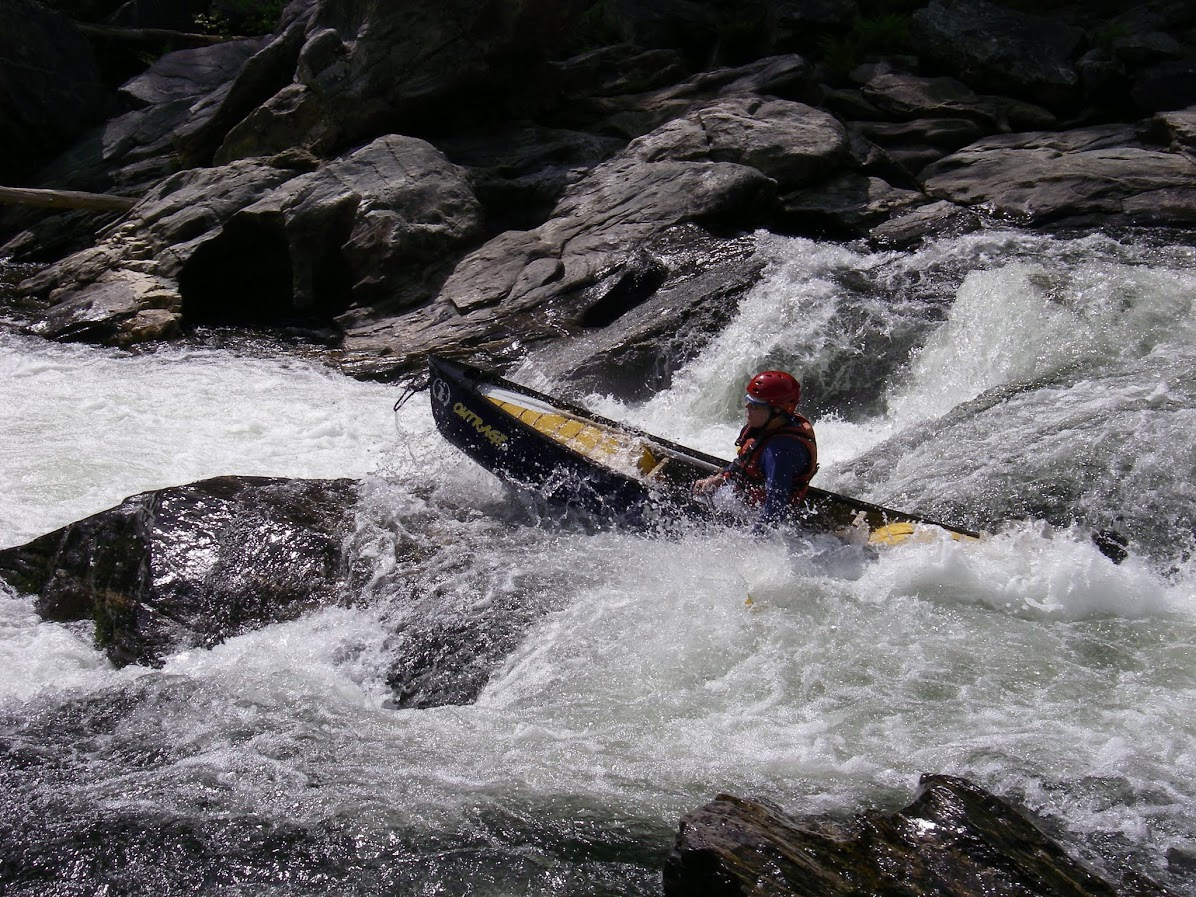
Marty Plante paddling a Mad River Outrage whitewater canoe on the Chattooga River.

Mad River Canoe (MRC) was founded in 1971 by Kay Wilson Henry and James A "Jim" Henry (1941-2025) — after Jim Henry won the 1971 National Whitewater Open Canoe Championships using a canoe of his own fiberglass design. The championship, organized by The Penobscot Paddle and Chowder Society, took place on the Dead River in western Maine, running from Eustis — with challenging sections of flat water, portages and whitewater.

Jim Henry's canoe design would ultimately become MRC's first and signature model, the Malecite, named after the Wolastoqiyik, also known as the Malecite, a First Nation of the Wabanaki Confederacy.

After winning the championship, the Henrys launched MRC and within a year demand outstripped the Henry's production capacity in their shed. MRC briefly partnered with Tubbs of Vermont to manufacture canoes. In 1973 Jim and wife Kay incorporated the Mad River Canoe Company and moved production to a facility in Waitsfield, Vermont, ultimately with 80 employees manufacturing over 40 of Henry's designs. MRC marketed via a network of 200 distributors, whose in-water demonstrations became one of the company's unique selling propositions. MRC's logo featured a pipe-smoking rabbit, from the "Native American legend that envisions a rabbit so sure of his own speed that he can sit in the bushes, smoking his pipe, even as his mortal enemy, the lynx, lurks nearby."

MRC's model line had expanded to comprise recreational, sporting, touring, and whitewater canoe designs, with models including the Adventure, Caption, Destiny, Expedition, Explorer, Freedom, Heritage, Journey, Legend, Outrage, Reflection, Synergy, Serenade and Malecite models. MRC was noted for its numerous cutting edge designs using advanced technologies, notably rotomolded, Royalex, pre-preg, carbon fiber, and Kevlar construction — as well as the patented IQ/IQ2 modular gunwale systems, track-based rail systems allowing tool-free, customizable outfitting, where users could slide, swap, or remove accessories on the fly without making permanent hull alterations.

In 1998, Mad River Canoe merged with Wilderness Systems of North Carolina to form Confluence Watersports, joined shortly thereafter by Wave Sport kayaks. In 2001, production moved from Vermont, to Trinity, North Carolina. In 2019, Pelican International acquired Confluence Outdoors. In 2005, Confluence acquired Dagger and Perception and operations were consolidated in Easley, South Carolina.

The MRC brand was decommissioned in 2022. After the demise of MRC, Henry marketed his designs under the Henry Designed label, working with his son Dana and Adirondack Canoe Company. Jim Henry died in 2025.

=== Perception Kayaks ===
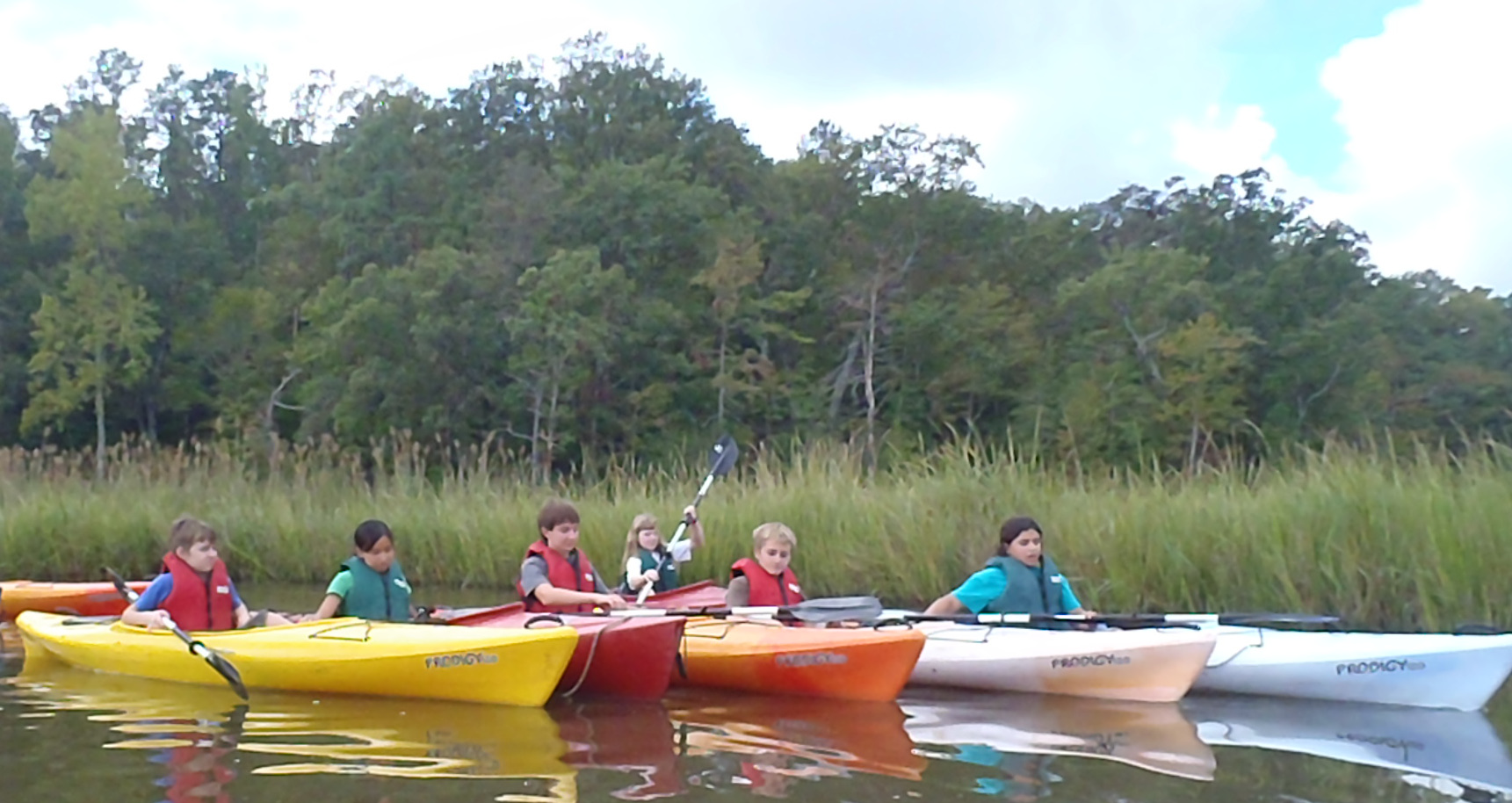
Students engaging in outdoor education on the York River in Perception Prodigy kayaks

Manufacturer of fishing, recreational, and touring kayaks - including the Carolina, Essence, Expression, Impulse, Prodigy, Tribe, Tribute, and Triumph models. Perception Kayaks was founded by Bill Masters in the early 1970s. The company develops rotational molding of plastic kayaks, reducing the expense and maintenance of kayaks.

=== Wilderness Systems ===
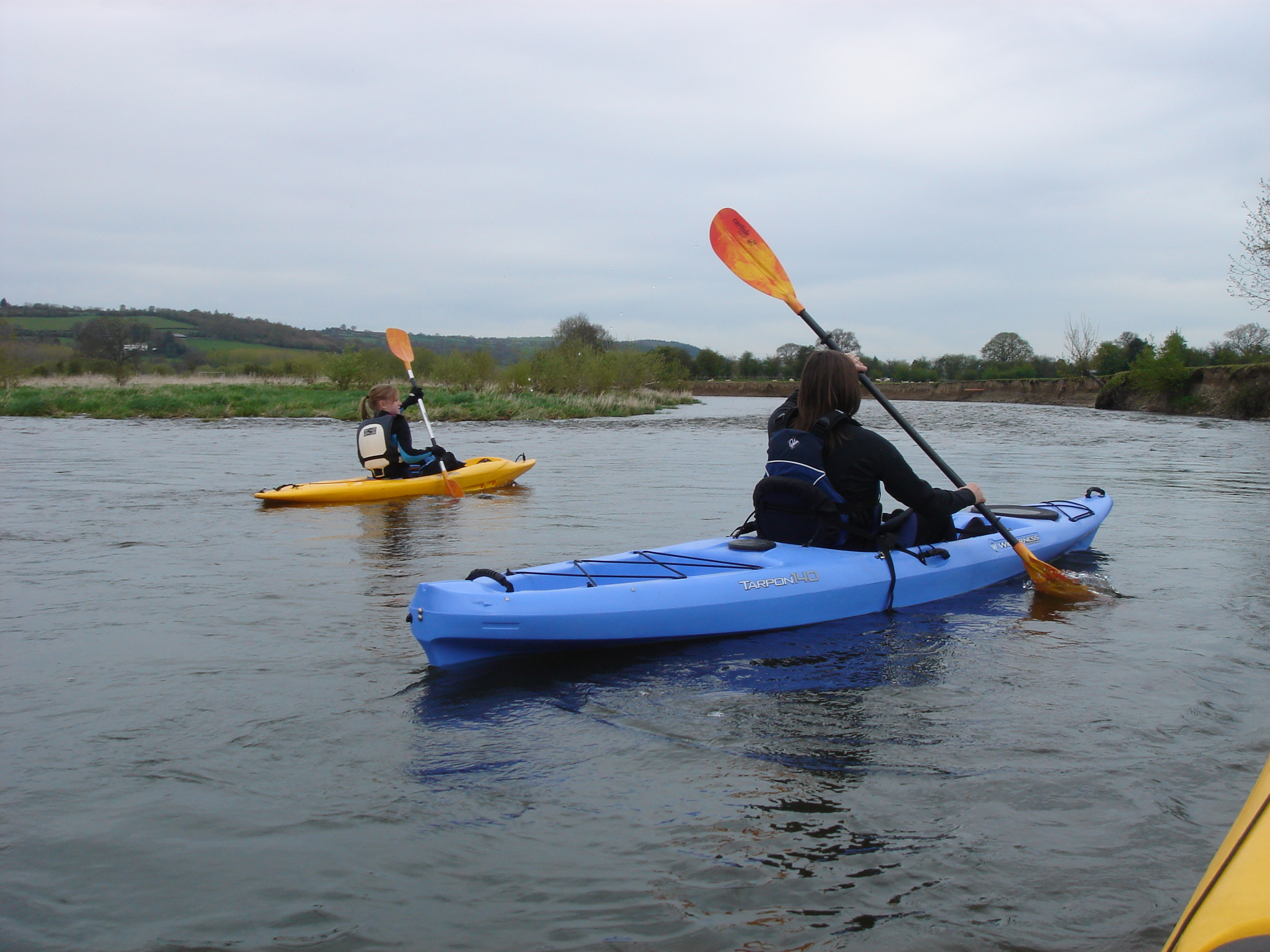
Kayaking on the River Wye in Wilderness Systems Tarpon kayaks

Manufacturer of fishing, recreational, and touring kayaks - including the Aspire, Commander, Focus, Pamlico, Pungo, Ride, Tarpon, Tempest, Tsunami, and Zephyr models. Andy Zimmerman and John Sheppard founded Wilderness Systems in 1986 in North Carolina.
