= Surfing in Canada =

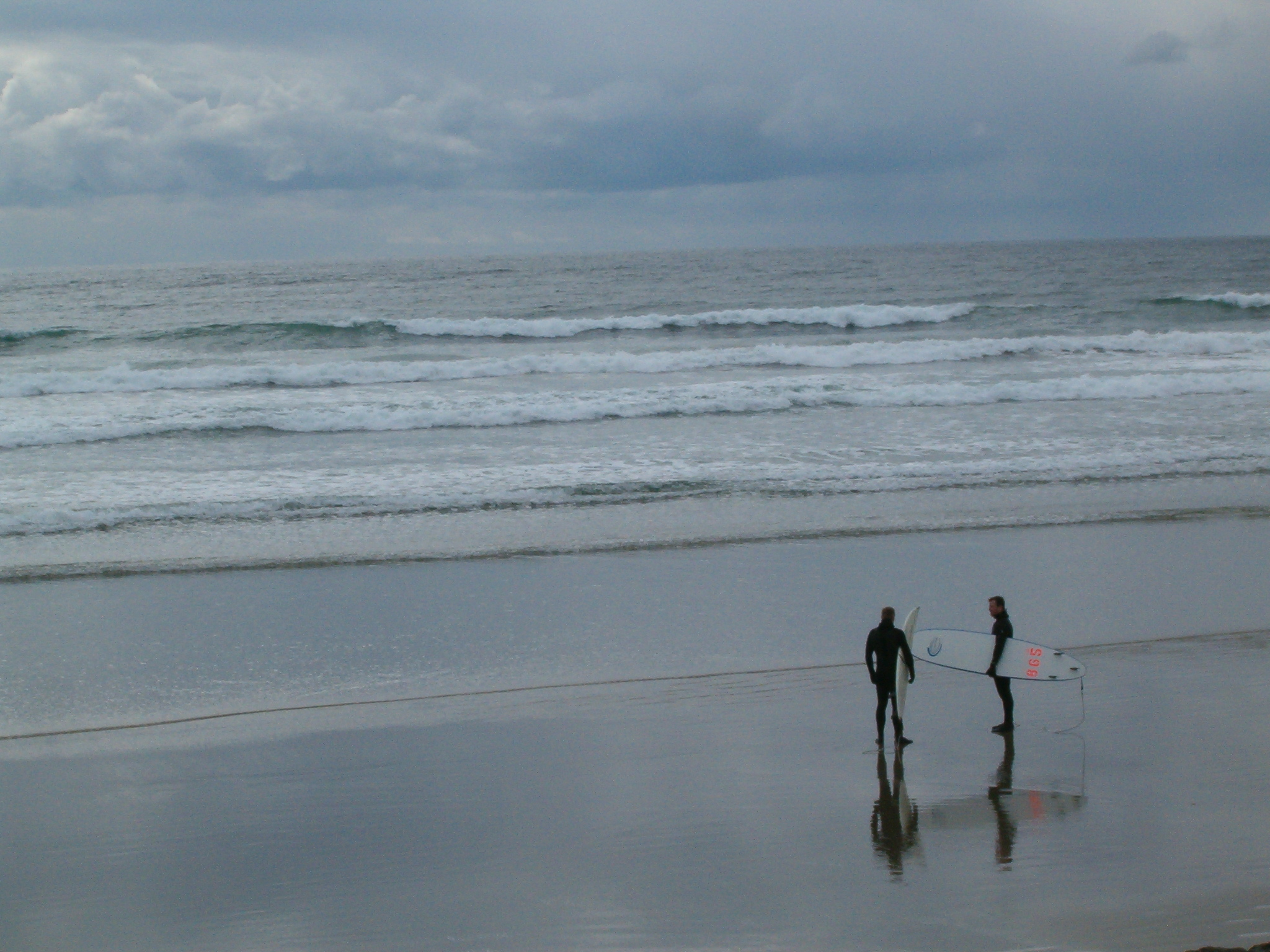
Surfers on the beach at Ucluelet, British Columbia.

Surfing in Canada is practised on its east and west coasts, as well as via lake surfing on the Great Lakes, and river surfing on standing waves and tidal bores.

== Ocean surfing ==
The Pacific Ocean on the west coast of Canada has the most active surf scene in Canada. Tofino, British Columbia is the unofficial surf capital of Canada. Canada's west coast has surfable waves year-round, and Tofino was listed in the world's Top 50 surf destinations by CNN and Outdoor Magazine named Tofino the 'best surf town' in North America in 2010. In Tofino, ocean water temperatures are consistent year-round, averaging 8-12 degrees (C), and advancements in wetsuit technologies are attributed with making year-round surfing comfortable and safe. Bordered by an old growth rainforest, Tofino also has the most temperate climate in Canada. The Atlantic Ocean on Canada's east coast also has a growing surfing scene. Tofino has remained relatively undeveloped due to its proximity to Clayoquot Sound, a UNESCO-protected biosphere reserve.

== River surfing ==
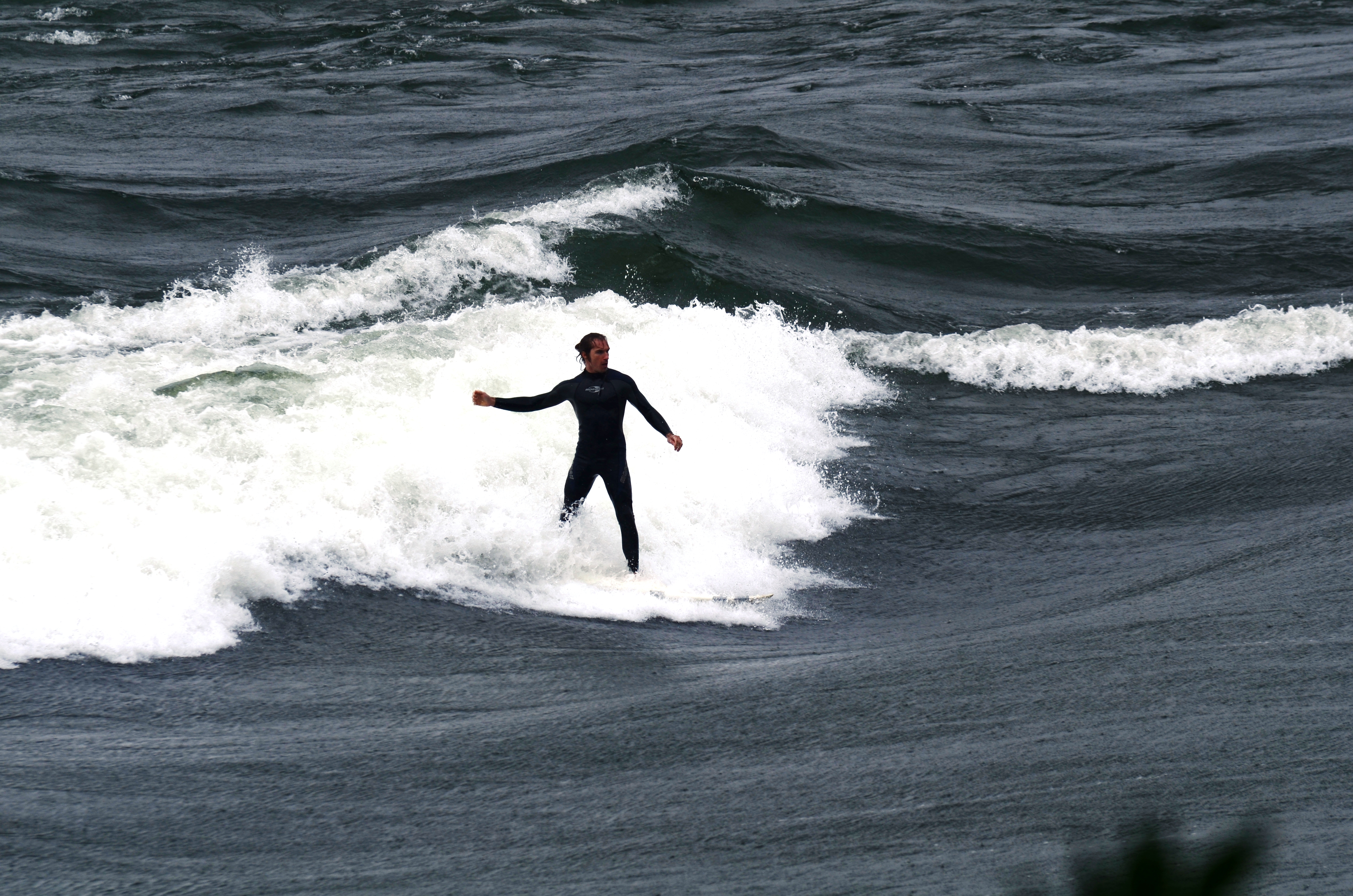
Surfing the Habitat 67 standing wave, in the Lachine Rapids.

On 24 July 2013, the North American record for surfing a single river wave was set on the Petitcodiac River's tidal bore, in New Brunswick.

The Lachine Rapids in St. Lawrence River in Montreal is home to the Habitat 67 standing wave. The Ottawa River in Ottawa also has an active river surfing community. There are also growing river surfing scenes in traditionally inland prairie areas like Alberta, and Manitoba.

== Lake surfing ==
The Great Lakes in Ontario have an active surf scene. There are surf communities on Lake Huron, Lake Erie, Lake Ontario, and Lake Superior. The Wyldewood Surf Club, dedicated to lake surfing, was established in Port Colborne in 1965.

== Competitions ==
Sanoa Dempfle-Olin became Canada's first surfer to compete in the Olympics at the 2024 Summer Olympics in Paris.

== See also ==
- Sports in Canada
- Tourism in Canada
