= Wehrbach =

Wehrbach may refer to:

- Wehrbach (Nidda), a river of Hesse, Germany, tributary of the Nidda

two rivers of the Englischer Garten, Munich, Bavaria, Germany

- Oberer Wehrbach
- Unterer Wehrbach
