= Oberer Wehrbach =

River in Germany

Location
- Country: Germany
- State: Bavaria

Physical characteristics
- Source
  - coordinates: 48.1662°N 11.6022°E
- Mouth
  - coordinates: 48.1675°N 11.6062°E

Oberer Wehrbach is of small river in the Englischer Garten, a public park in Munich, Bavaria, Germany. It branches off the Schwabinger Bach and flows into the Oberstjägermeisterbach.

== See also ==
- List of rivers of Bavaria
