= Sarp Falls =

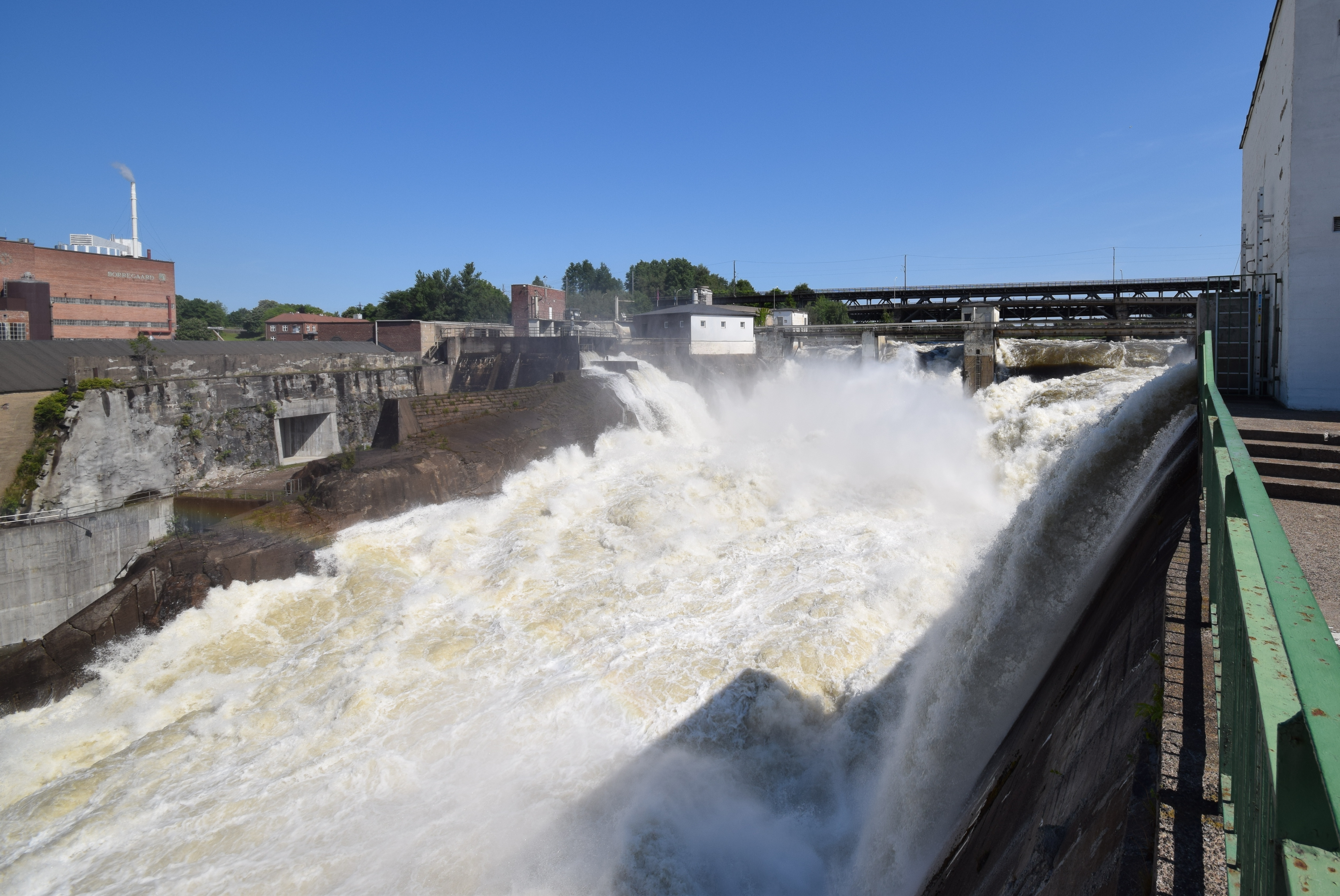
- Sarpefossen in May 2014

- Location within Norway South
- Location: Østfold county in southeastern Norway
- Coordinates: 59°16′34.0″N 11°7′51.22″E
- Total height: 20.5 m
- Average flow rate: 577 m³/s

Sarp Falls (Norwegian: Sarpefossen or Sarpsfossen) is a waterfall at Sarpsborg in Østfold, Norway. It is the second largest waterfall in Europe by discharge, after the Rhine Falls.

This is the last waterfall on the Glomma River, which is the longest river in Norway. The waterfall has a total vertical drop of approximately 20.5 m (67 ft). Its large discharge is a consequence of the extensive drainage basin of the Glomma above Sarpsborg, which covers approximately 41,182 km^{2} (15,900 sq mi). During major floods, the waterfall and its associated river channels can carry several thousand cubic metres of water per second.

The falls have played an important role in the history and development of Sarpsborg. The location was associated with the foundation of the medieval town of Borg by Olav Haraldsson in 1016, and the waterfall later became an important source of mechanical power for mills and sawmills. From the late 19th century onward, the waterfall became a major source of hydroelectricity and helped attract large-scale industry to the area.

Sarp Falls is situated where the Glomma passes through the Østfoldraet, a major moraine ridge formed during the Last Glacial Period. The moraine obstructs the river's natural route and forces the Glomma toward the east, where it passes over a bedrock threshold and forms the waterfall.

According to Sarpsborg municipality, the present waterfall developed when the Glomma broke through the moraine ridge approximately 4,000 years ago. The formation of the falls created a distinctive geographical boundary between areas to the north and south and contributed to the importance of the site as a settlement and transportation location.

The Glomma is Norway's longest river. Immediately north of Sarp Falls, the river system divides into several branches. The principal eastern branch passes through Sarpsborg and over Sarp Falls, while another branch passes through Mingevatnet, Vestvannet and Visterflo before rejoining the main river system farther south.

The drainage basin of the Glomma above the waterfall covers approximately 41,182 km^{2} (15,900 sq mi). The large catchment contributes to the exceptionally high discharge of the falls compared with many other European waterfalls. The average flow at Sarp Falls is approximately 577 m^{3}/s (20,400 cu ft/s), although the discharge varies considerably with season and precipitation.

The flood-discharge capacity associated with the falls is approximately 3,400 m^{3}/s (120,000 cu ft/s).

== History ==
=== Early settlement ===
The area around Sarp Falls has been associated with early human settlement for thousands of years. The location combines the Glomma, the Østfoldraet and fertile land, creating favourable conditions for settlement and transportation.

According to the saga tradition, King Olav Haraldsson established the town of Borg at the waterfall in 1016. The king is said to have established a fortified settlement, a royal estate and a church at the site. Borg later became the predecessor of modern Sarpsborg and was an important centre in medieval Norway.

The waterfall therefore became closely associated with the development of Sarpsborg. The settlement's position beside the Glomma provided free access to the river and its resources while the falls offered a natural geographical landmark and a source of mechanical energy.

== River surfing ==
Sarpebølgen (lit. the Sarp Wave) lies about 2-3 kilometers downstream from the Sarp Falls, and is popular among kayakers and experienced surfers. The Norwegian Cup in Freestyle Paddling has been arranged here. The wave is spectacular, since it is quite big in regards to river surfing. Experienced surfers have warned beginners from trying the wave, since there are strong currents which means one can easily be dragged far downstream. The wave appears when the flow rate is above 800-900 m^{3}/s. It is said that the wave is well suited for surfing on a surfboard at a flow rate from 1250 m^{3}/s and up, and very well at around 1700 m^{3}/s. Glommens og Laagens Brukseierforening provide freely available flow measurements of the river flow online.

Average water flow and temperature

Place	Map	Jan	Feb	Mar	Apr	May	Jun	Jul	Aug	Sep	Oct	Nov	Dec	Unit
Sarp Wave	59.2653°N 11.1038°E	1	1	1	3	8	13	16	16	12	7	3	1	°C
Sarp Wave	59.2653°N 11.1038°E	500	470	390	500	1000	1100	850	650	550	570	520	510	m^{3}/s

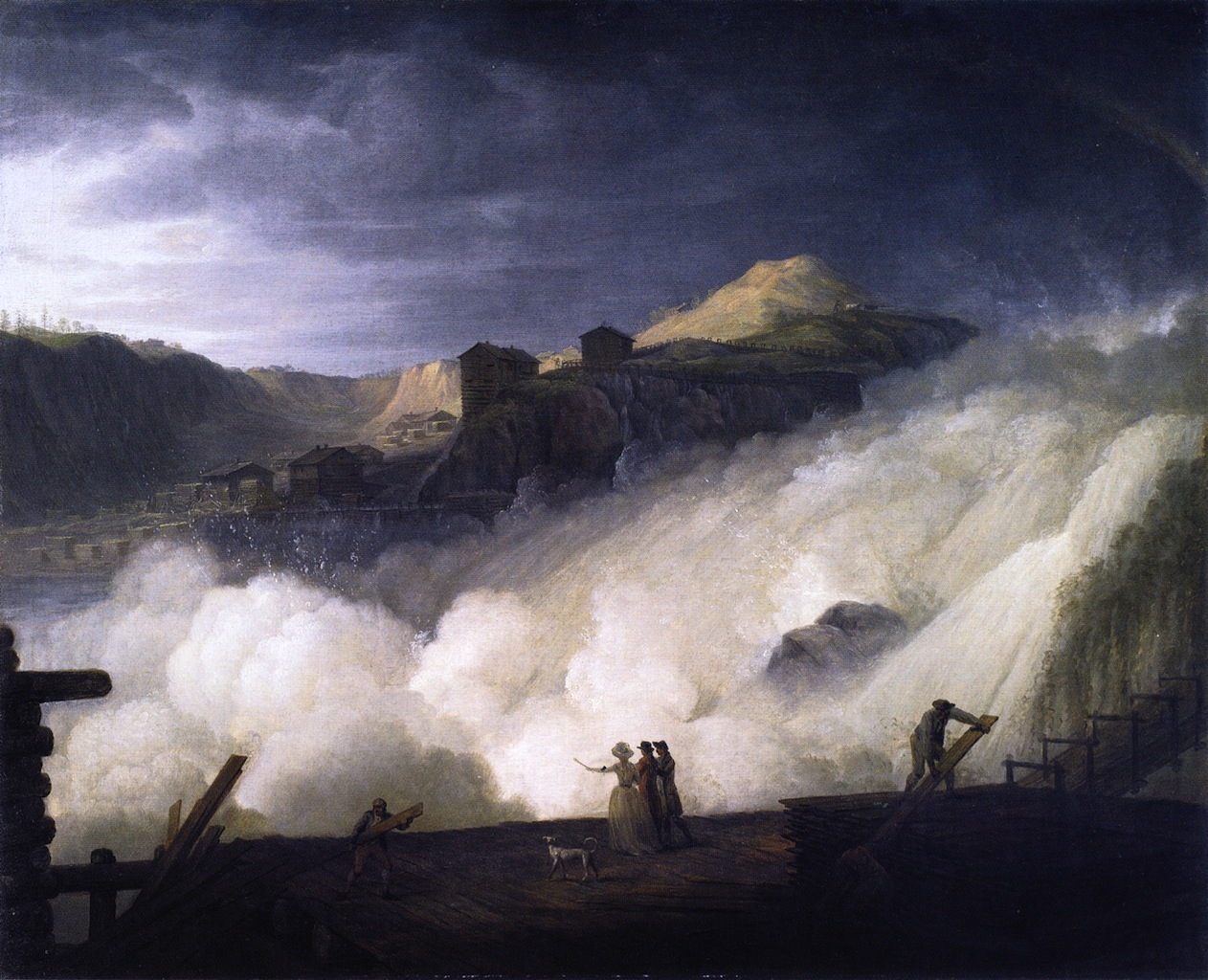
Sarpsfossen Painting by Erik Pauelsen (1749–1790)

== See also ==
- List of waterfalls
- List of waterfalls by flow rate
