= Schloss Biederstein =

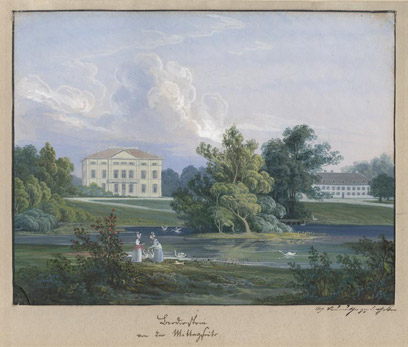
The Neues Schloss (left) and the Altes Schloss of Schloss Biederstein (right) around 1830, aquatint by Carl August Lebschée

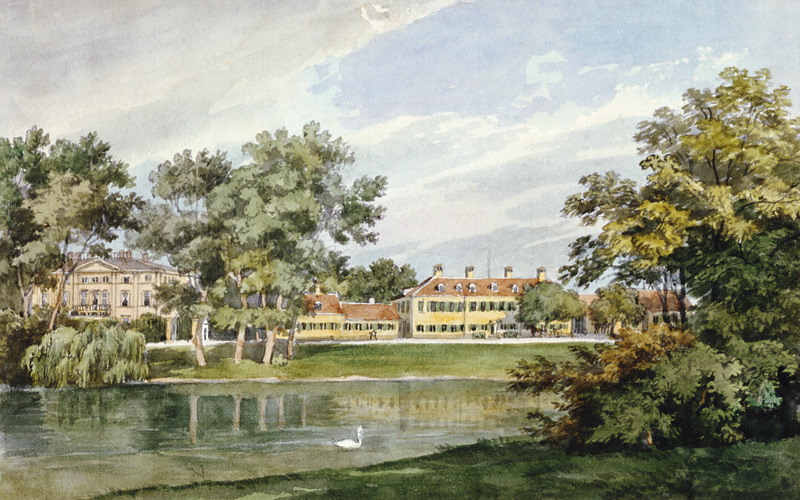
Schloss Biederstein, watercolor painting by Heinrich Adam, Staatliche Graphische Sammlung München

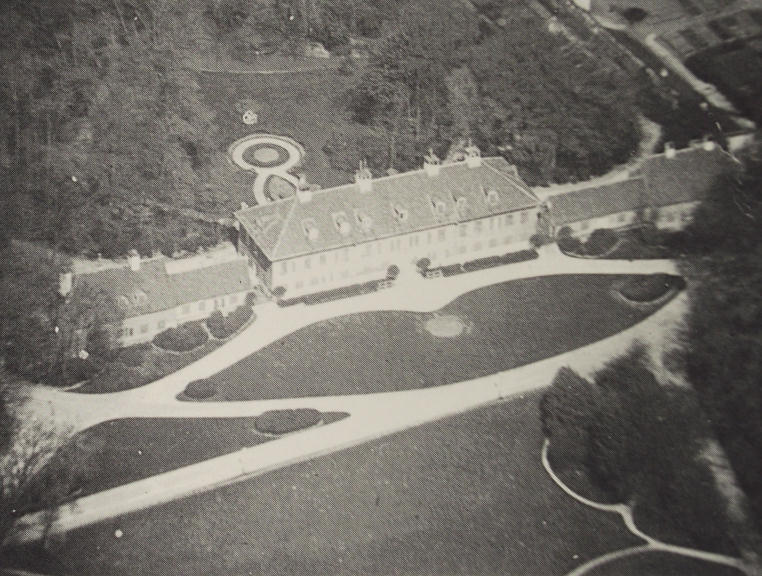
Aerial view of the Altes Schloss, 1890

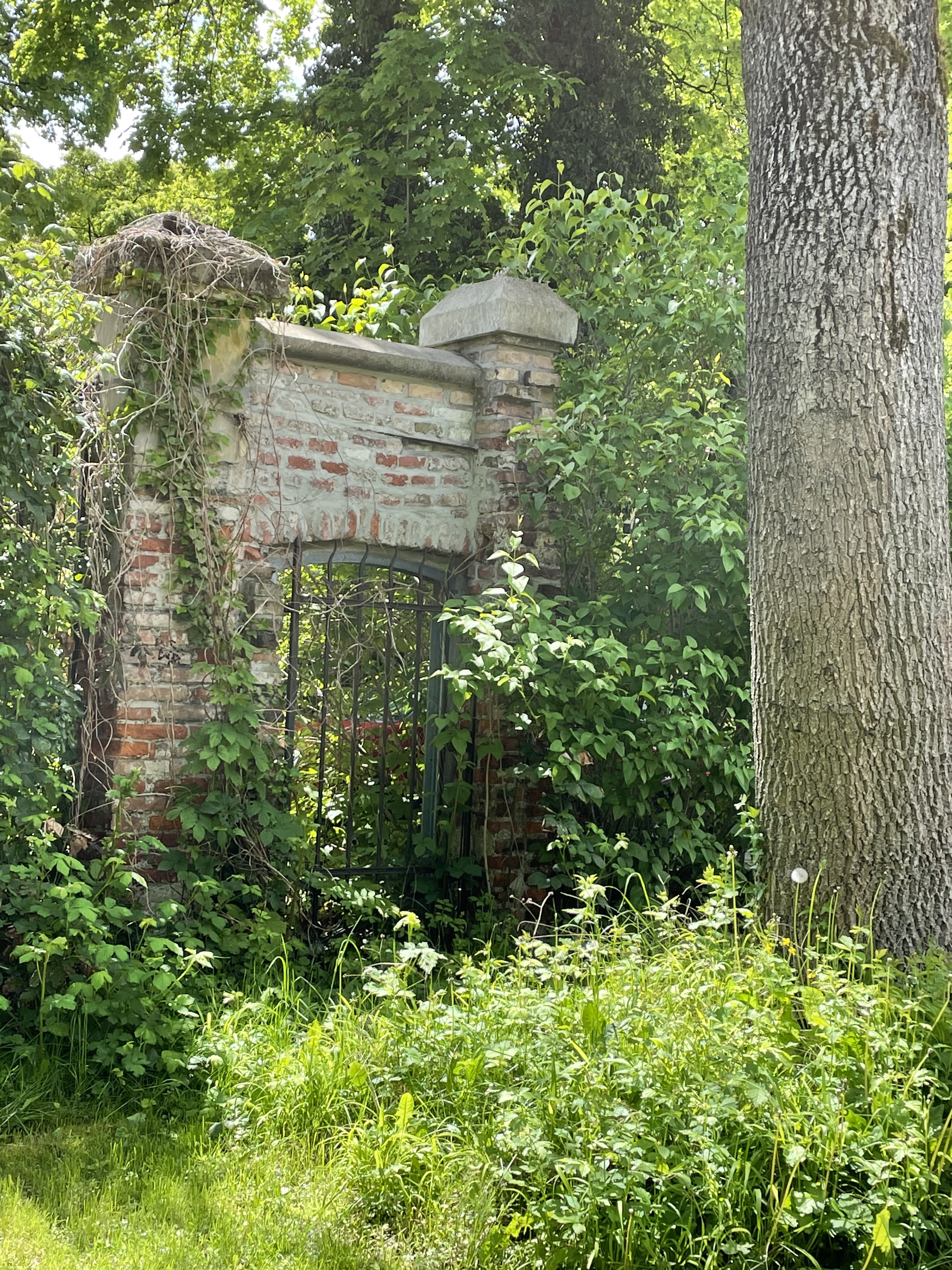
Remains of the Altes Schlosses (northern side)

Schloss Biederstein (Palace Biederstein) was a palace complex in the Munich neighborhood of Schwabing. It was located in the area of today's Biedersteiner Strasse and Biedersteiner Tunnel and north of the Kleinhesseloher See in the Englischer Garten. It consisted of two old buildings, the so-called Altes Schloss (Old Palace) and the Neues Schloss (New Palace). Remains of the demolished Schloss Biederstein include gate with pillars, brick pillared entry with pedestrian gate, custodian's house and are listed as protected monuments by the Bavarian State Office for Monument Protection, D-1-62-000-7888.

== History ==
At the beginning of the 18th century, a simple two-story manor house was built. It had a hip roof and divided by windows in five axes. Prince-Elector Charles Theodor gave it to Geheimrat Freiherr Stephan von Stengel as a knightly fief in 1784.

In 1803, King Maximilian I Joseph of Bavaria bought the building and gifted it to his wife Caroline as a country house. It was redesigned in 1804 to plans by court architect Franz Thun, before five-axis extensions were added to both sides in 1825. Queen Caroline used the palace as her widow's residence after the death of her husband.

In the palace gardens, which also no longer exist, there was a belvedere by Karl von Fischer. This was demolished during the building of the Neues Schloss. In front of the Altes Schloss, there was a lake, Biedersteiner See, with two small islands. The lake was fed by an inlet from the Schwabinger Bach.

In the period between 1826 and 1830, the classicist Neues Schloss was built according to plans by architect Leo von Klenze.

The Neues Schloss was demolished in 1934 and on this site there were residential buildings, an office for the publishing house C. H. Beck and probably (albeit only for a short time if it was the case) a riding school for the SS.

The Alte Schloss was destroyed in 1944 during World War II. In 1945, the remaining ruins were demolished. Duke Luitpold Emanuel in Bayern sold the property of Schloss Biederstein. From 1951 to 1955 a student housing complex was built according to plans from the architects Otto Roth and Harald Roth in collaboration with Charles Crodel, who in created the faience wall of its garden hall in 1954.

== Literature ==
- Werner Meyer: Burgen und Schlösser in Bayern. Weidlich, Frankfurt am Main 1961.
- Damien Bilteryst, Olivier Defrance, Joseph van Loon: Les Biederstein, cousins oubliés de la reine Élisabeth, années 1875–1906. Museum Dynasticum, Bruxelles, XXXIV/1 2022.
