= Corran Addison =

South African canoeist

Corran Descy Addison (born in South Africa) is a slalom canoeist, whitewater kayaker, surfer and surfboard designer. He is now based in Montreal, Quebec.

== Beginnings ==
Addison began kayaking in South Africa as a young child with his father. They would construct the fiberglass kayaks they needed to paddle the rivers in the basement of Rhodes University where his father Graeme Addison was a professor of journalism. Throughout the 1980s, their kayaking consisted of long multi day expeditions in the unknown, and it was here on these long expeditions that Addison forged his love for paddling adventure. The beginnings were simple however, as he and his friends did not know about basic skills such as the Eskimo Roll until he and his friends saw a paddler roll in a TV show called American Sportsman. They were astonished, replayed the segment of the tape, and with the aid of the 1981 world silver medalist kayaker Jerome Truran, taught themselves to roll.

In the early 1980's a small shipment of "plastic" kayaks entered the country (which was under international sanctions because of the Apartheid regime)and Graeme purchased two of the kayaks, the Perception Dancer for Corran and himself. Effectively indestructible, short and maneuverable, these boats completely changed the face of paddling for the young paddler whose skillsets increased at such a rapid rate that by 1987 he claimed to have run the highest waterfall in the world; a 31m dam in Tignes, France.

== Competitions ==
Addison competed internationally in whitewater slalom in the early 1990s. He finished 34th in the K-1 event at the 1992 Summer Olympics in Barcelona. In 1987, Addison successfully ran the highest waterfall ever attempted in a kayak: a 31m vertical drop into Lake Tignes in France. The unofficial record stood for over a decade until it was broken in 2004 by Ed Lucero's 34m waterfall in the Northwest Territories of Canada. In 1989, he famously ran 85-foot Looking Glass Falls in a Batman costume. The river was running low, so the landing was shallow, and Addison broke his back.

Addison competed for South Africa in a number of world freestyle kayaking championships, winning more events than any other competitor in the years 1993 to 1999, and earned a silver medal in 1995 and 1999, and bronze in 1998. He also produced a number of kayaking films between 2002 and 2007.

== Design career ==
Addison has had a long career in kayak design.

=== Early career ===
As well as a competitor, he became known in the whitewater kayaking community as a designer by pioneering a number of innovative designs (including his first planing-hulled kayak in 1988, later independently reinvented by Canada's Necky Kayaks. Addison continued to work on the concept and brought it to the mass market in the early 1990s that is the technology upon which most modern whitewater kayaks are based). Working for Perception Kayaks, Addison was responsible in part for the design of one of the world's best selling creek boats, the Corsica, in 1990. He left Perception and started Savage Designs in 1994, leaving in 1996. In 1995, he designed the Fury, one of the world's first planing-hulled river kayaks. His marketing at Savage Designs laid the groundwork for the Generation X marketing that was to be followed by his next start-up company, Riot Kayaks, where he worked as chief designer and head of marketing.

=== Riot Kayaks ===
The Riot brand was notorious for cutting edge designs and a go-for-broke attitude to freestyle kayaking and extreme white water. One boat which he designed was the Glide, the kayak that is reputed to have been responsible for a last-minute rule change at the 1997 world championships because it was so far ahead in technology that he was considered to have an unfair advantage by the other athletes. He also designed the Disco in 1999, the design which all modern freestyle kayaks are measured against today.

=== Imagine Media ===
In 2002 Addison took his tinkering in the field of making sports action videos from an amateurish pastime to a professional level when he started Imagine Media. He produced the award-winning film, End Game, and numerous other films including "Legend of the Falls", "Air force 1", and "Mad Boys". He also worked on several Hollywood film projects as a stuntman or providing safety.

=== Imagine Surfboards ===
After leaving Riot in 2003, he began designing for Dragorossi, a new Kayak brand out of Italy. He was becoming more interested in surfing which had become his new passion, despite surfing his whole life starting in Durban South Africa where he lived through the 1980s. Addison owned and designed for his surf company called Imagine Eco, based out of Montreal. The name was changed to Imagine Eco, and was considered a cutting-edge company in the field of sustainable and ecological business, and has been leading the way in promoting responsible manufacturing in the surf industry.. He sold it to the investment firm "The Contrarian Group" in California in 2010 for $2 million. Imagine Surf (the name was changed again when it was subsequently sold to the Pryde Group, based out of Hong Kong). Corran is also a competitive Stand Up Paddle Surfer and competed in the 2010 Hawaiian World Cup, has won numerous distance and racing SUP competitions all of the world, and is a big wave surfer, having surfed such well knows spots as Wiamea, Makaha and Sunset.

=== Corran SUP ===
IN 2012 Corran started his next venture, Corran SUP, based out of Southern California. The brand pioneered paddleboards for use in whitewater, and focused on "made in the USA", producing almost everything in the United States. Corran built a reputation as a leading shaper of both surfing and racing paddleboard designs, with several of his designs getting rave reviews in the industry magazines. In January 2015 the brand was sold to Kayak Distribution.

He pioneered surfing the Habitat 67 wave in Montreal. His company Imagine Surfboards offers river surfing lessons, teaching over 3,500 students in Montreal since 2005. Imagine also manufactures and sells surfboards, suits and accessories.

=== Soul Waterman ===
In 2015 Corran started his latest company, SOUL WATERMAN. Based in Montreal Canada, where he started Riot in the 1990s, the brand is designing a new line of whitewater specific paddleboards and kayaks. Corran arrived with his latest innovation, custom kayaks. He developed a method of manufacturing one piece, one-off designed from the ground up for each paddlers needs, something which is completely unique to kayaking.

=== Other Sports ===
Corran retired from competitive kayaking in 2002, and since then has gone on to compete in Paddleboarding and SUP Surfing. He has competed at a world class level, taking part in the surfing world Cup, and has competed and won SUP racing events internationally. Corran was one of the first people in the United States to be certified by the National Ski Patrol on a Snowboard. He was a sponsored snowboarder for many years, racing in the Mid Atlantic series for several years. Corran is also a licensed sportbike motorcycle racer, competing on sportbikes.
