= Oberstjägermeisterbach =

River in Germany

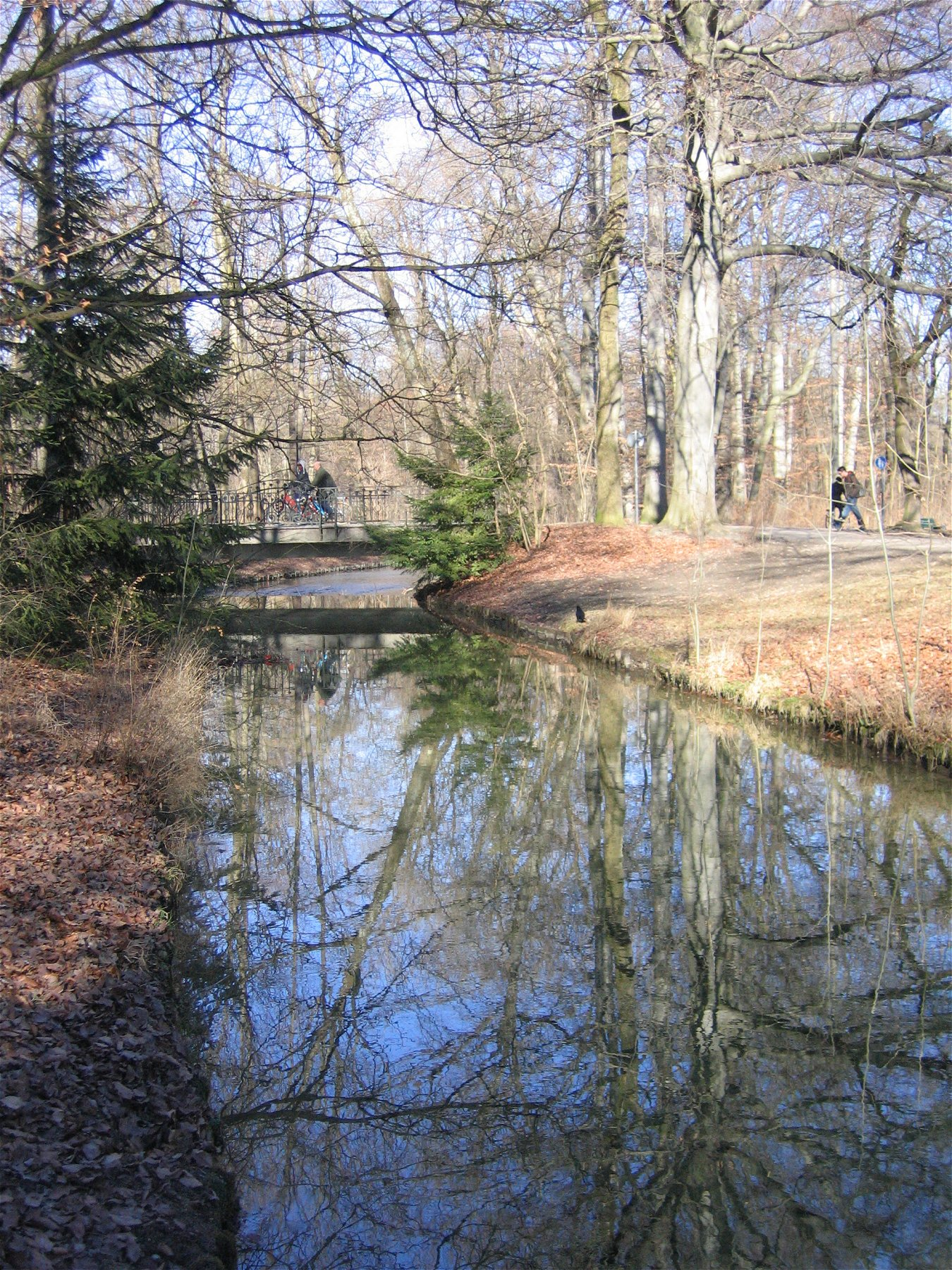

Location
- Country: Germany
- State: Bavaria

Physical characteristics
- Source
  - location: branch of the Eisbach in the Englischer Garten
  - coordinates: 48.1482°N 11.5929°E
- Mouth
  - location: into the Schwabinger Bach in the Englischer Garten
  - coordinates: 48.1853°N 11.6224°E

Oberstjägermeisterbach is a small river of Bavaria, Germany. It flows through the Englischer Garten in Munich. It branches off the Eisbach, and flows into the Schwabinger Bach.

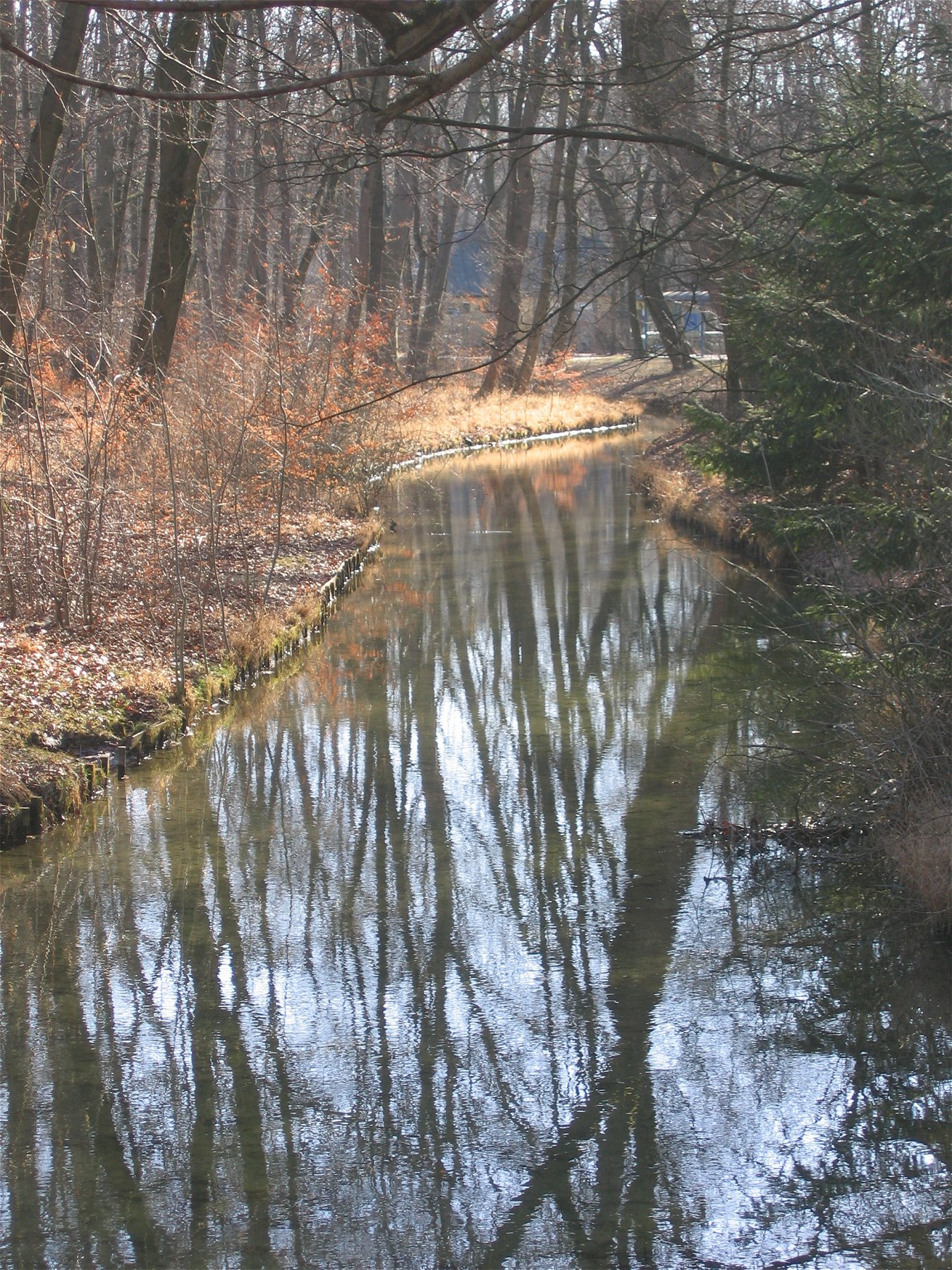
Oberstjägermeisterbach

== See also ==
- List of rivers of Bavaria
