= Mingevannet =

Lake in Norway

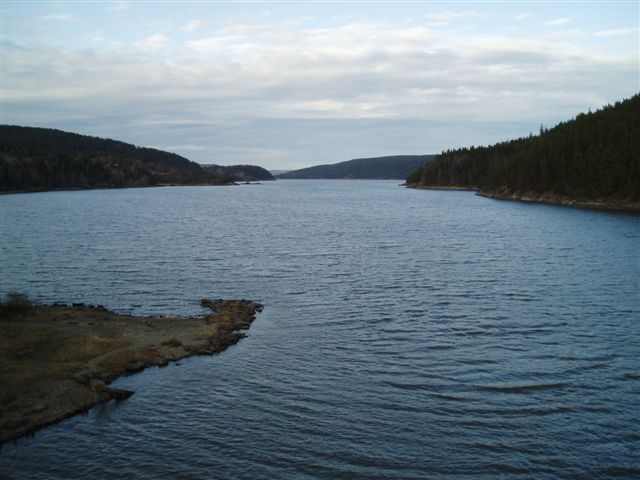

- Location within Østfold
- Location: Østfold county
- Coordinates: 59°22′39″N 11°07′10″E
- Catchment area: 27.98 km^{2} (10.80 sq mi)
- Basin countries: Norway
- Surface area: 4.26 km^{2} (1.64 sq mi)
- Shore length^{1}: 77.88 km (48.39 mi)
- Surface elevation: 24 m (79 ft)
- References: NVE
- ^{1} Shore length is not a well-defined measure.

Mingevannet is a lake in Østfold county, Norway. It forms a part of the Glomma watershed together with Ågårdselva and Visterflo.

== See also ==
- List of lakes in Norway
