= Unterer Wehrbach =

River in Bavaria, Germany

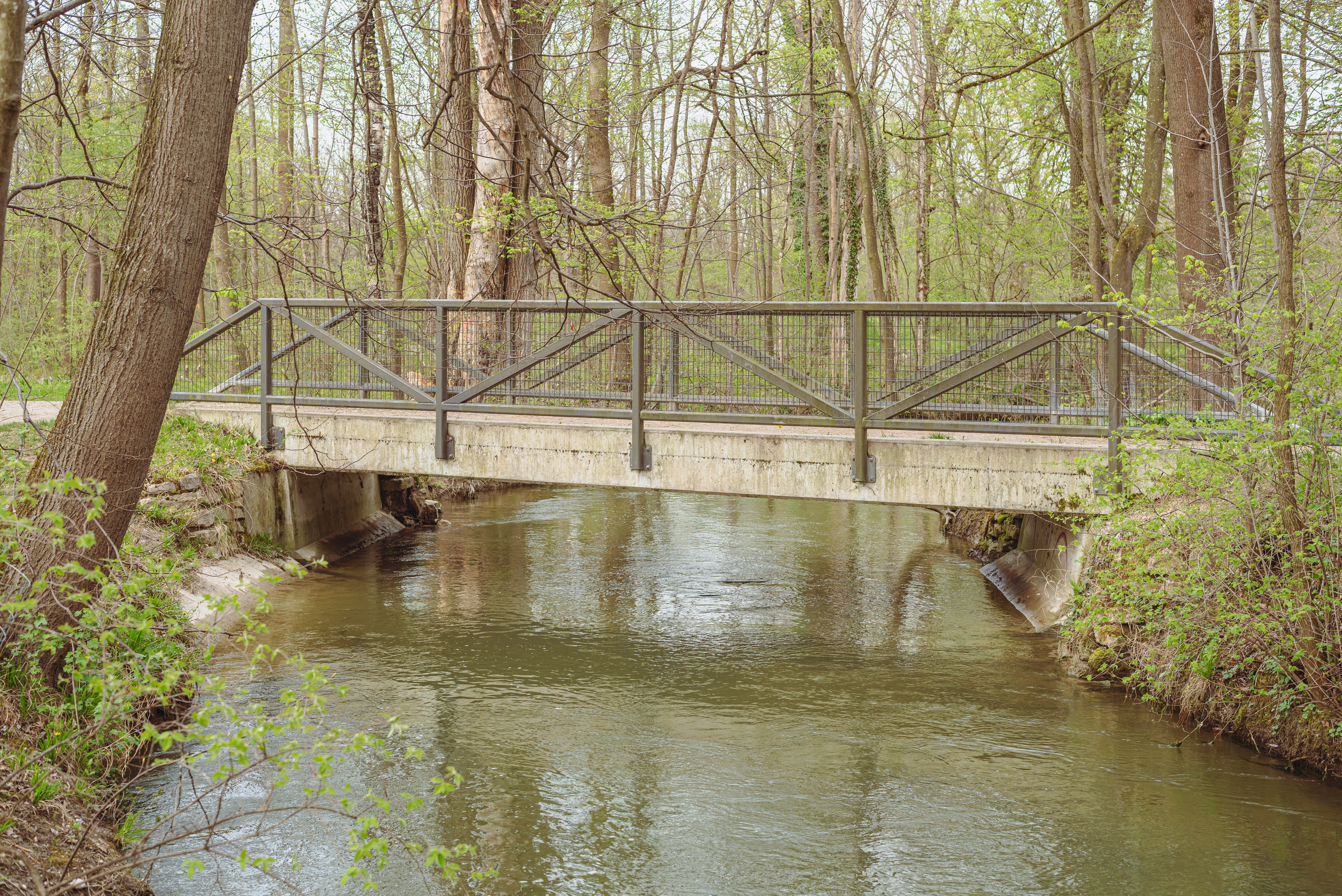
- A bridge across the Unterer Wehrbach

Location
- Country: Germany
- State: Bavaria

Physical characteristics
- Source
  - coordinates: 48.1706°N 11.6125°E
- Mouth
  - coordinates: 48.1690°N 11.6159°E

Unterer Wehrbach is a small river in the Englischer Garten, a public park in Munich, Bavaria, Germany. It branches off the Oberstjägermeisterbach and flows into the Isar.

== See also ==
- List of rivers of Bavaria
