= Sluppen Bridge =

Bridge in Trondheim, Norway

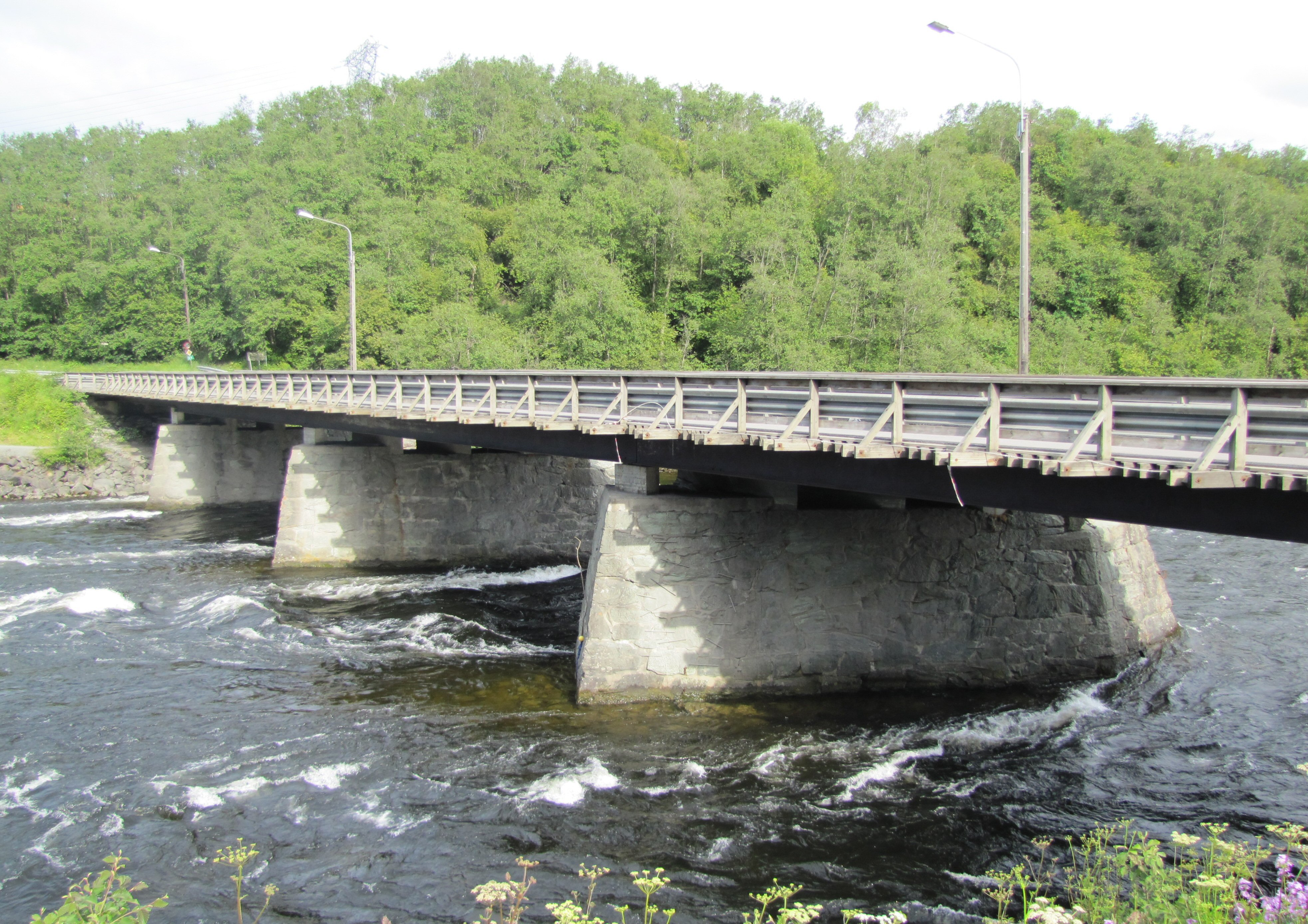
Sluppen bru

Sluppenbrua (lit. Sluppen Bridge) is a road bridge across the Nidelva river in Trondheim, Norway. It is 82 meters long, and is currently a pedestrian and cycling bridge.

Originally, Sluppenbrua was built as a railway bridge on the Trondhjem–Støren Line, which was opened in 1864. This bridge was around 200 m long og 30 m tall, made by timber standing on a foundations of rock. This bridge was torn down in 1884 when the new Dovre Line going by Nidareid was opened. The foundations were transferred for free to the Norwegian Public Roads Administration in 1927 with the intent to build a road bridge on the same spot.

The new road bridge was postponed, resulting in the first road bridge to be built being a provisional truss bridge built in wood by order of the German military. This bridge was opened in July 1942. The wood was not waterproofed, which meant that the bridge gradually decayed and had to be closed. A new bridge made of steel was opened in 1954. In 1977 the bridge was equipped with a separate path for pedestrians and cyclists. Today the bridge still stands on the same foundations from 1864.

Until October 2023 the bridge was a part of Norwegian National Road 706 (riksvei 706) before the adjacent Nydalsbrua was finished, and is now solely used by cyclists and pedestrians.

== River surfing ==
Under Sluppenbrua lies the Sluppenbølgen (lit. Sluppen Wave), which is used for river surfing on surfboards or kayaks. The wave is said to work well for these purposes when the flow rate is around 140 cubic meters per second. Such a high flow rate is usually only seen when the snow melts during the spring, or when there is heavy rain, but also depends on how much water that is released from the power plants Øvre and Nedre Leirfoss kraftverk. Otherwise, it can be challenging to surf without holding a rope. The Sluppen wave is the only well known surfing spot near Trondheim, but on days with heavy winds it is sometimes also possible to surf in the Trondheim Fjord.

The repair work of the Sluppen Bridge has affected the Sluppen Wave, and in 2018 the Trondheim Sports Council entered dialogue with the Public Roads Administration.

Average water flow and temperature

Place	Map	Jan	Feb	Mar	Apr	May	Jun	Jul	Aug	Sep	Oct	Nov	Dec	Unit
Sluppen Wave	63.3955°N 10.3862°E	3	2	2	3	4	6	11	14	12	4	5	3	°C
Sluppen Wave	63.3955°N 10.3862°E	131	130	113	137	121	193	99	67	65	75	112	72	m^{3}/s
