= Wyldewood Surf Club =

The Wyldewood Surf Club is a lake surfing club founded in 1965 in Port Colborne, Ontario, on the northeastern shore of Lake Erie by U.S. and Canadian surfers. It is recognized as the oldest surf club on the Great Lakes.

Known for their surf events and contests, the members of the Wyldewood Surf Club today are active in promoting awareness for beach cleanups, surf etiquette, and upholding "The Stoke for Surfing".

== Original members ==
You can't surf a lake

The first 17 Club members were local cottagers and surfers from the Hamilton area that learned to surf with very minimal equipment and boards. While a few of the original club members remain, over the years the club has grown to about 50 members, many of whom still surf Lake Erie as well as the hundreds of other breaks along the Great Lakes. Some members have moved onto bigger coasts but still recognize the Wyldewood Surf Club as a foundation in their surf experience.

- Don Harrison (Buffalo, NY)
- Magilla Schaus (Buffalo, NY)
- Rick Gillie (Hamilton, ON)
- Jack Gillie (Hamilton, ON)
- Derek Richardson (Hamilton, ON)
- Tom Christopher (Kenmore, NY)
- Tom Nelson (Hamilton, ON)
- Keith Jukes (Hamilton, ON)
- Joe Slack (Hamilton, ON)
- Vern Ferster (Hamilton, ON)

The first published photograph of a club member, Magilla Schaus, surfing a lake wave was in Surfing Magazine in 1969; it was also published in The Buffalo News and Hamilton Spectator.

- John O'Hear (Lewiston, NY)
- Darcy O'Hear (Lewiston, NY)

== Events ==
The club's first ever Eastern Surfing Association Surf Contest called the ESA - Gales of November was held on the north shore of Lake Erie on Pleasant Beach on November 7, 1998. This event was attended by surfers from all over the Great Lakes region.

Glass Love - held during August, is a celebration of the beauty and aesthetic of the surf board. Collectors, vendors, family and friends gather on a summer day at Pleasant Beach to view all kinds of boards and to celebrate the surf community. Raffles and prizes, and if the surf is good, everyone is happier. Drunk skate tops off the event where competitors battle it out for prizes and glory.

The Gales of November - Memorial surf contest to celebrate the life and passion of Magilla Schaus, previous President and long time surfer. Surfers come together to a Paddle Out and spend the day surfing in very cold temperatures.
