= Lac de Tignes =

Lake in Tignes, France

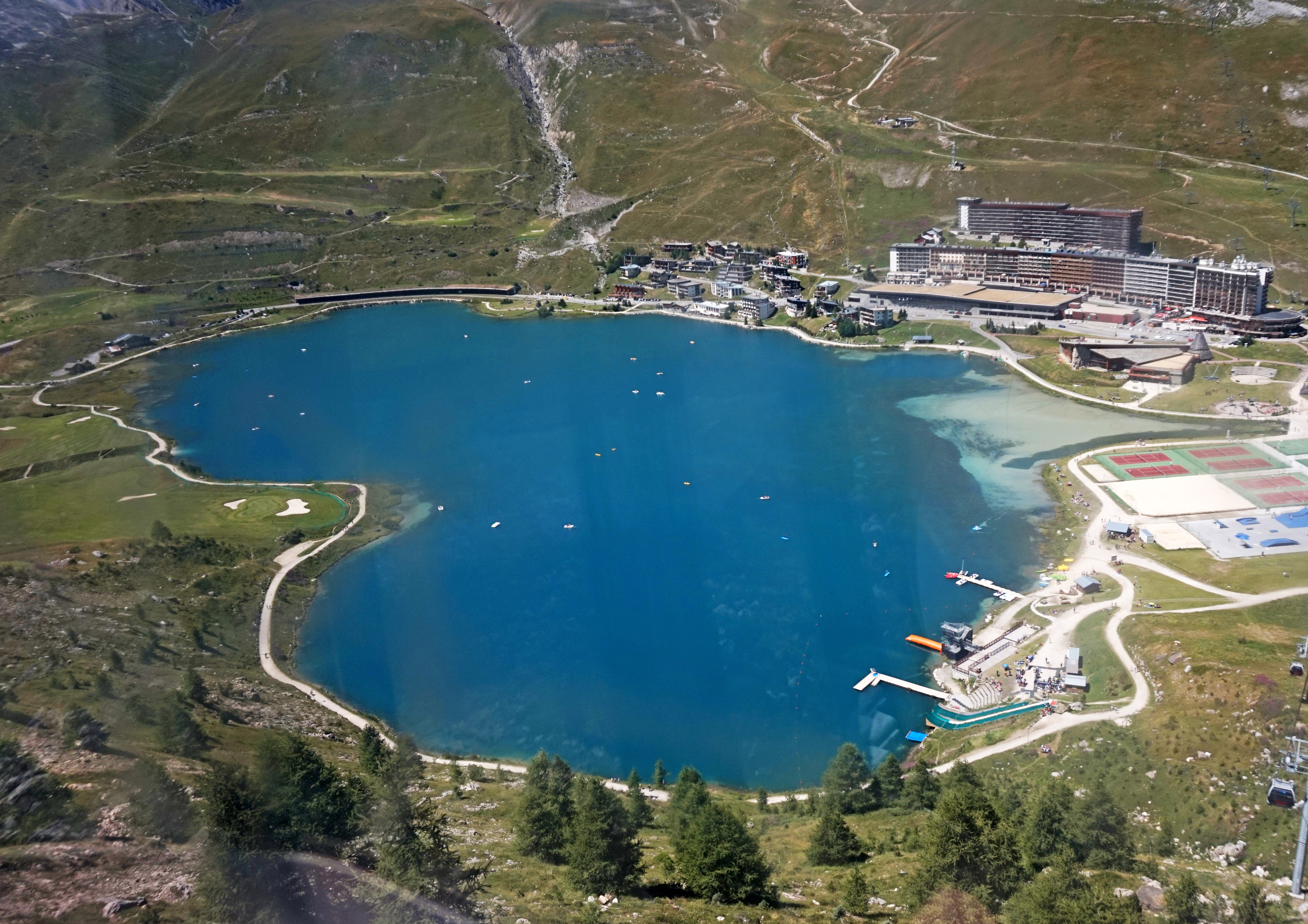

- Location within Savoie
- Location: Savoie
- Coordinates: 45°27′55″N 6°54′15″E
- Basin countries: France

Lac de Tignes is a lake at Tignes in the Savoie department of France. It is a glacial lake that also contains the famous Tignes Dam, also referred to as the Chevril Dam. The creation of the dam forced the local citizens of Tignes to relocate.
