= River surfing =

Surface water sport

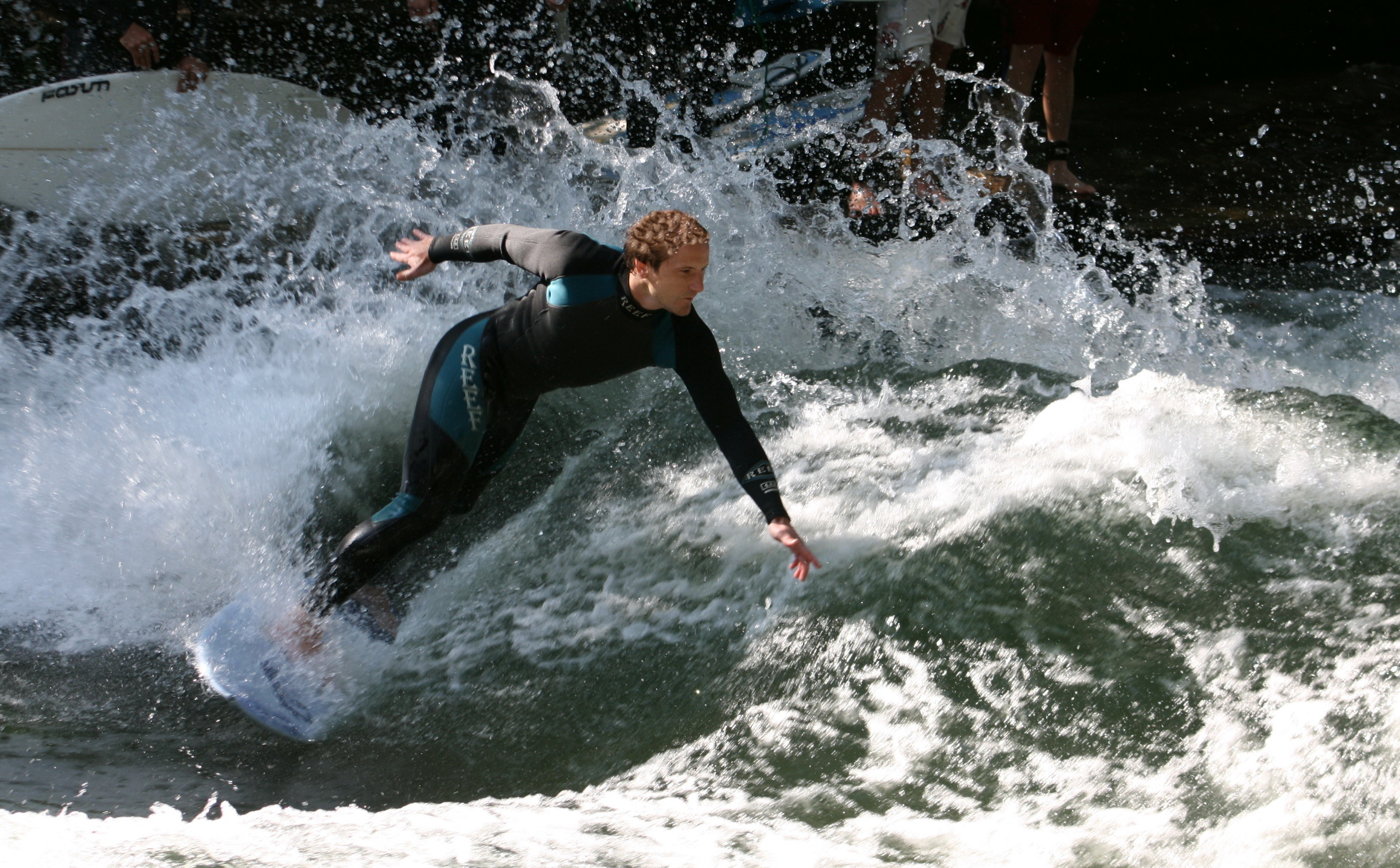
Surfer on the Eisbach, Englischer Garten, Munich, Germany.

River surfing is the sport of surfing either standing waves, tidal bores or upstream waves in rivers. Claims for its origins include a 1955 ride of 2.4 km (1.5 mi) along the tidal bore of the River Severn.

River surfing on standing waves has been documented as far back as 1972 on an artificial wave created on a section of the Eisbach man-made river, a side arm of the Isar River, near Haus der Kunst in the Englischer Garten park in Munich, Germany, today offering the world's largest urban surfing spot.

== Standing waves ==
In this type of river surfing, the wave is stationary on the river, caused by a high volume of water constricted by flowing over a rock and creating a wave behind. A requirement for this is a flowing water with shallow depth in which the inertia of the water overcomes its gravity due to the supercritical flow speed (Froude number: 1.7 - 4.5, surpassing 4.5 results in direct standing wave) and is therefore neither significantly slowed down by the obstacle nor pushed to the side. It is a form of hydraulic jump. A river surfer can face up-stream and catch this wave and have the feeling of traveling fast over water while not actually moving.

River surfing conditions are created by a combination of underlying rock formations and specific water levels, i.e. not too much or too little water. Water flow is usually measured in the SI-unit cubic meters per second (m^{3}/s) (alternatively in liters per second or cubic feet per second).

== European standing waves ==
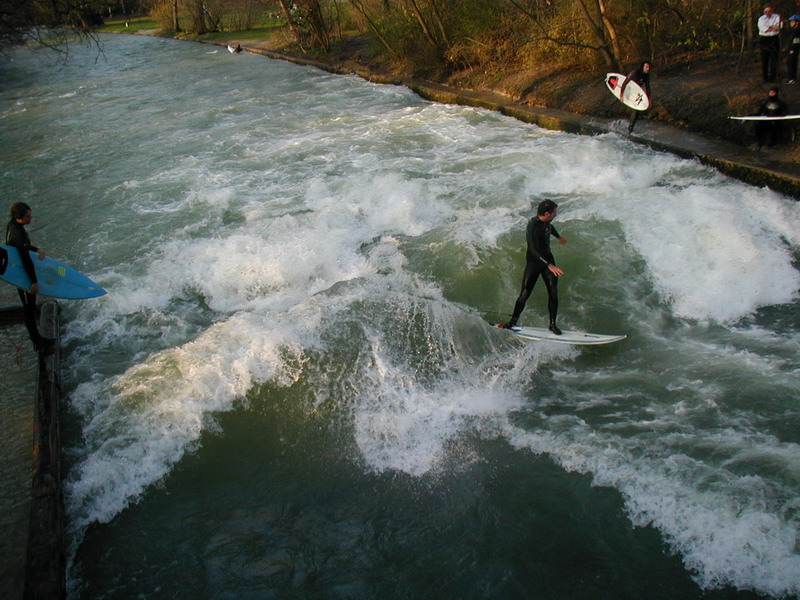
Surfing a standing wave on the Eisbach.

=== Germany ===
Despite being many hundreds of kilometres from the nearest ocean, Munich has a reputation as a surfing hotspot, offering one of Europe's best waves. The Bavarian capital is the birthplace of river surfing. The city has been the center of surfboard riding on a standing wave since the early 1970s. "Dieter Deventer has been doing this since 1973". Up to 100 surfers daily hit the waves in the city's Englischer Garten, the third largest urban park in Germany. There, in the river Eisbach, the world's best known river surf spot, the Eisbach (literally “ice brook”) wave, the flow velocity of the icy water is about 5 meters per second, at a flow rate of 20 m^{3}/s (equivalent to a mass of 20 tons per second), and the temperature never gets above 15 degrees Celsius. An annual surfing competition is held on the standing wave. Additionally, there are further standing waves that form on the river Isar just downstream of the Wittelsbacherbrücke bridge in Isarvorstadt, as well as on the canal that joins the Isar channel with the Floßlände.

Munich has produced top river surfers and was the first location that created a surfing community around an inland river wave. The scene has around 1,000 active surfers, while 10,000 in Munich will have tried it at some point.

=== Austria ===
On Austria's river Mur in Graz (Styria), river surfing is a regular on two waves built for surfing in 2001 and rebuilt in 2004 by KanuClub Graz. Near Salzburg in the Alm Canal there is a custom built surf wave, the Almwelle.

=== Norway ===
Norway has several river waves, amongst the most famous are:

- Bulken Wave (Bulkenbølgen) at Voss.
- Sluppen Wave (Sluppenbølgen) in Trondheim.
- Sarp Wave (Sarpebølgen) in Sarpsborg.
- Rand Wave (Randsbølgen) in Hønefoss.

Several artificial river waves are either under planning or have been considered:

- In Oslo a potential, artificial river wave has been planned in their main city river Akerselva.
- In Stavanger, an artificial river wave for surfboards and kayaks was planned in Figgjoelva, but was opposed by the Norwegian Water Resources and Energy Directorate and the Stavanger and Rogaland Hunting and Fishing Association.
- In Evje a river wave project called the Evje Wave (Evjebølgen) is being planned at the river mouth of Otra, the largest river in the Southern Norway region. The Otra river is already popular for rafting and other extreme sports. Concept drawings have been published, and the project is advertised as having a low environmental impact.

=== Switzerland ===
The Limmat in Zürich does not have any standing waves but is fast-flowing. Local surfers have developed a pulley system known as upstream surfing which allows surfers to surf the river.

== North American standing waves ==
=== Canada ===
The Habitat 67 standing wave in the St. Lawrence River in Montreal, named for its location adjacent to the Habitat 67 housing complex, has become a popular destination for river surfing. Corran Addison, an Olympic kayaker and three-time world freestyle kayak champion, was the first to surf the Habitat wave in 2002. His river-surfing school, Imagine Surfboards, has taught 3,500 students since 2005. A second Montreal river-surfing school, KSF, has hosted 1,500 students a year since 2003. From fewer than 10 original surfers, it is estimated that the current of participants numbers around 500.

The Ottawa River in Ottawa has long been a river surfing destination for both locals and travellers. Local surf shops specialize in river surfing gear and boards. Average wave height varies between one and two meters. The waves are most accessible in the spring with some remaining rideable year-round.

In the 2000s, transplanted ocean surfers began riding standing waves in a number of rivers in Alberta, Canada. Several shops in Calgary now stock boards specifically designed for river surfing. The standing wave under the 10th Street bridge in Calgary, has been a popular place for river surfing since its formation after the 2013 Alberta floods Since the mid-2010s, the Alberta River Surfing Association is spearheading transformative river wave projects in Southern Alberta, including a river park in downtown Calgary and Cochrane. The most popular area to river surf around Southern Alberta is in Kananaskis district (45 min from Calgary) at a spot called Mountain Wave. As of the early 2020s, projects of building two additional adjustable man-made river waves are well under way.

=== United States ===
Jackson Hole, Wyoming, is known as the most famous river surfing community in the US. The first documented cases of surfing on the Snake River occurred in the late 1970s. The wave known as Lunch Counter is a standing wave that churns during times of snow runoff in the months between May and August each year. This wave is highly active during these months and the area continues to grow as a surf destination.

Pueblo, Colorado, has also become a river surfing city. A kayak park was in built 2005 near downtown Pueblo and locals have been surfing features 3, 4, and 7 ever since.

Missoula, Montana, has surfing on Brennan's Wave, a man-made wave on the Clark Fork River.

Boise, Idaho, has surfing at the Boise Whitewater Park near downtown Boise. The Boise Whitewater Park features two adjustable man-made waves, Phases 1 and 2 on the Boise River. The recreational features upgraded old hazardous irrigation diversion dams, and provide other benefits such as flood mitigation and river navigability. Because the Phase 1 waveshaper is adjustable, river surfing is available nearly year around. The Surfer's Journal article "The Surf Gods of Idaho" says surfing Boise's river is like "pausing the ocean with a remote control and pressing rewind, but then surfing that backward-flowing wave in forward motion".'

Bend, Oregon, has an adjustable man-made river wave in Bend Whitewater Park for all season surfing.

Salida, Colorado has a whitewater park with six different features and a thriving river surfing scene. In fall of 2022, hydrologists from Recreation Engineering and Planning (REP) based in Salida engineered a wave specifically for surfing. The wave, called the Scout Wave 2.0, is meant to perform at even moderate water levels, opening up the season. River surfing is happening in Salida all year long on the Scout 2.0.

== New Zealander standing waves ==
The world's first commercial river surfing operation was started by Jon Imhoof in 1989. Trips are run on the Kawarau River near Queenstown. Bodyboards are used to run rapids and ride standing waves on the river.

== Tidal bores ==
Tidal bores occur in relatively few locations worldwide, usually in areas with a large tidal range (typically more than 6 metres (20 ft) between high and low water), and where incoming tides are funnelled into a shallow, narrowing river via a broad bay. Large bores can be particularly dangerous for shipping, but also present opportunities for river surfing. The funnel-like shape not only increases the tidal range, but it can also decrease the duration of the flood tide, down to a point where the flood appears as a sudden increase in the water level. The tidal bore occurs only during the flood tide, never the ebb tide.

A tidal bore can create a powerful roar that combines the sounds caused by the turbulence in the bore front and whelps, entrained air bubbles in the bore roller, sediment erosion beneath the bore front and of the banks, scouring of shoals and bars, and impacts on obstacles.

Tidal bores are being surfed along coastal rivers such as the pororoca on the Amazon River or England's River Severn.

=== Severn bore ===
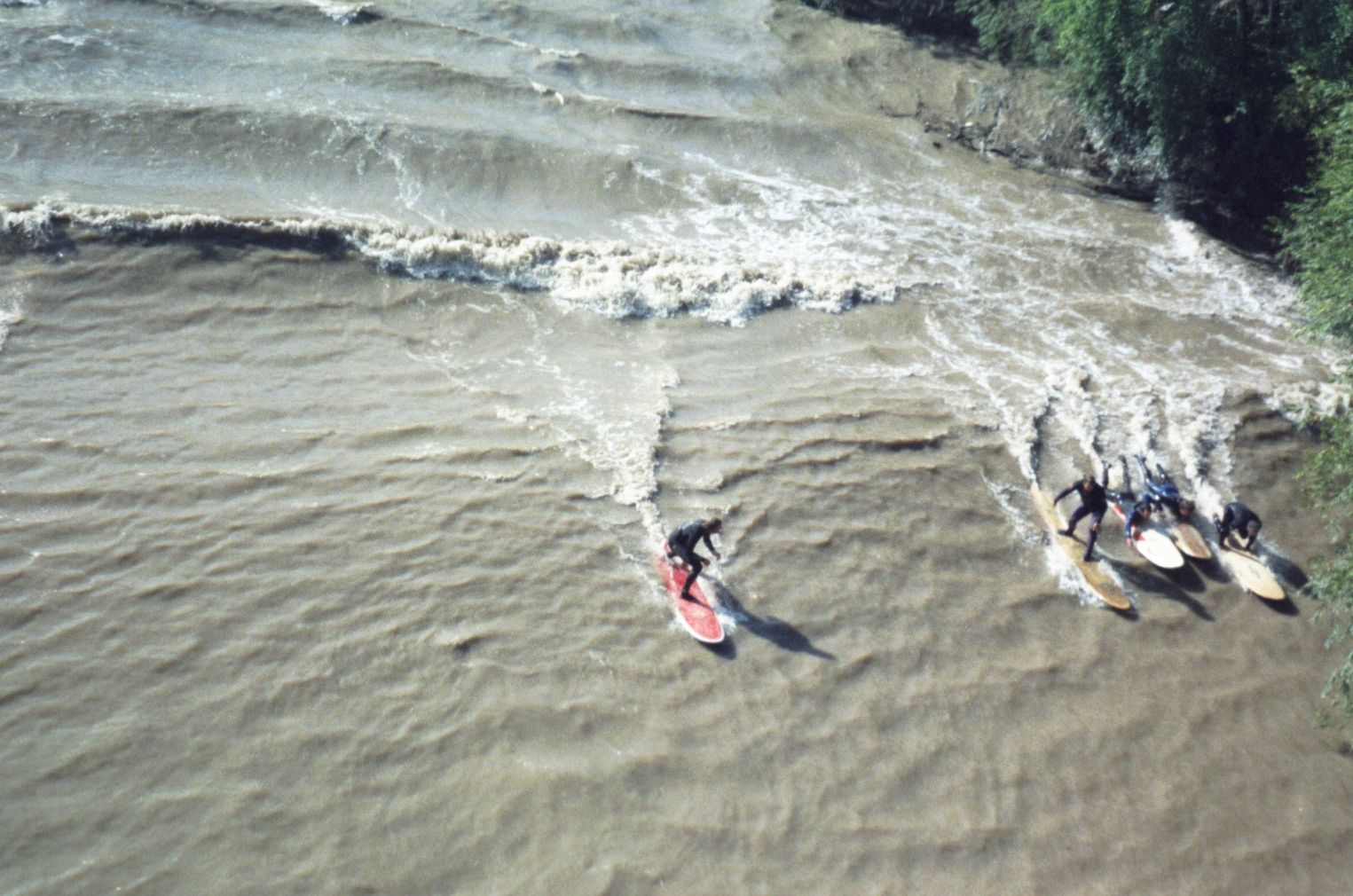
Surfers on the Severn bore

Surfing the Severn bore has become a competitive sport with dozens of surfers vying to record the longest ride. The tidal surge also attracts canoeists and windsurfers. The present champion surfer is Dave Lawson from Hempsted, Gloucestershire, who has covered 5.7 miles on a surfboard. His record-breaking surf took more than 35 minutes and was logged by an official adjudicator from the British Surfing Association.

=== Pororoca bore ===
The pororoca is a tidal bore, with waves up to 4 metres high that travel as much as 13 km inland upstream the Amazon River.

=== Petitcodiac bore ===
Tidal bores are backwards-moving waves that travel upstream over forward-moving downstream waves. They occur twice a day on the Petitcodiac River in the Bay of Fundy, driven up the river by the world's highest tides. The North American record for surfing a single river wave was set by J.J. Wessels and Colin Whitbread of California, who rode the Petitcodiac River bore for 29 kilometres on 24 July 2013.

== Upstream river waves ==
An upstream river wave is a phenomenon with a similar appearance to tidal bores, but is, just like a coastal wave, caused by ocean swells instead of tides. Similar to tidal bores, they form in the ocean and travel up the river.

== Building river surf waves ==
River surfing is gaining popularity around the world. Boise Whitewater Park's Wave Technician, Paul Primus, shares the dual benefit of installing recreational river features to replace dangerous low head dams everywhere. Building river surf waves can also help save lives. Replacing old low head dams with river recreation features can have many benefits - low head dam hazard abatement, river navigability, fish passage, flood mitigation, sediment transport, river blight removal, diversion infrastructure modernization, significant economic impact, provision of swiftwater training facilities, public health benefits, and introduce opportunities to help reduce regional youth drowning rates.

== Safety ==
Dangers associated with river surfing is hypothermia, drowning and blunt trauma. A significant and serious hazard are stainers, or logs in the river that can cause surfers to get pinned or become entangled. Board strikes to the head can cause injuries. If the water is cool, the surfer may dress in a wetsuit, neoprene boots and gloves. Even if the temperature is high, it is recommended to use footwear in order to avoid cuts from rocks in the river. Care should also be taken not to stand on the river floor where the water is moving. Leg entrapment may occur. Some choose not to use a leg rope ("leash") since there is a potential for the leash to get hung up in rocks, which can cause drowning if the surfer is unable to reach the hook-and-loop fastener due to strong currents. Depending on the river, it may also be appropriate to use a personal flotation device and helmet. To reduce danger, the surfer should also train specifically on swimming technique for rivers. When falling, one should try to fall as "flat" as possible so as not to hit rocks lying on the bottom of the river. If the surfing is done with the help of water ski rope or other type of rope fixed to shore, there should be at least one person on shore with a knife, scissors or other cutting tools available in case the rope needs to be cut for safety reasons, for example if the surfer gets tangled in the rope. River surfing is not risk free, and there have been deaths.

== See also ==
- Lake surfing
- Riverboarding
