= Visterflo =

Lake in Sarpsborg, Norway

- Location within Østfold
- Location: Sarpsborg, Fredrikstad (Østfold]])
- Coordinates: 59°17′39″N 11°0′19″E
- Basin countries: Norway
- Surface area: 3.35 km^{2} (1.29 sq mi)
- Shore length^{1}: 10.84 km (6.74 mi)
- Surface elevation: 0.1 m (3.9 in)
- References: NVE
- ^{1} Shore length is not a well-defined measure.

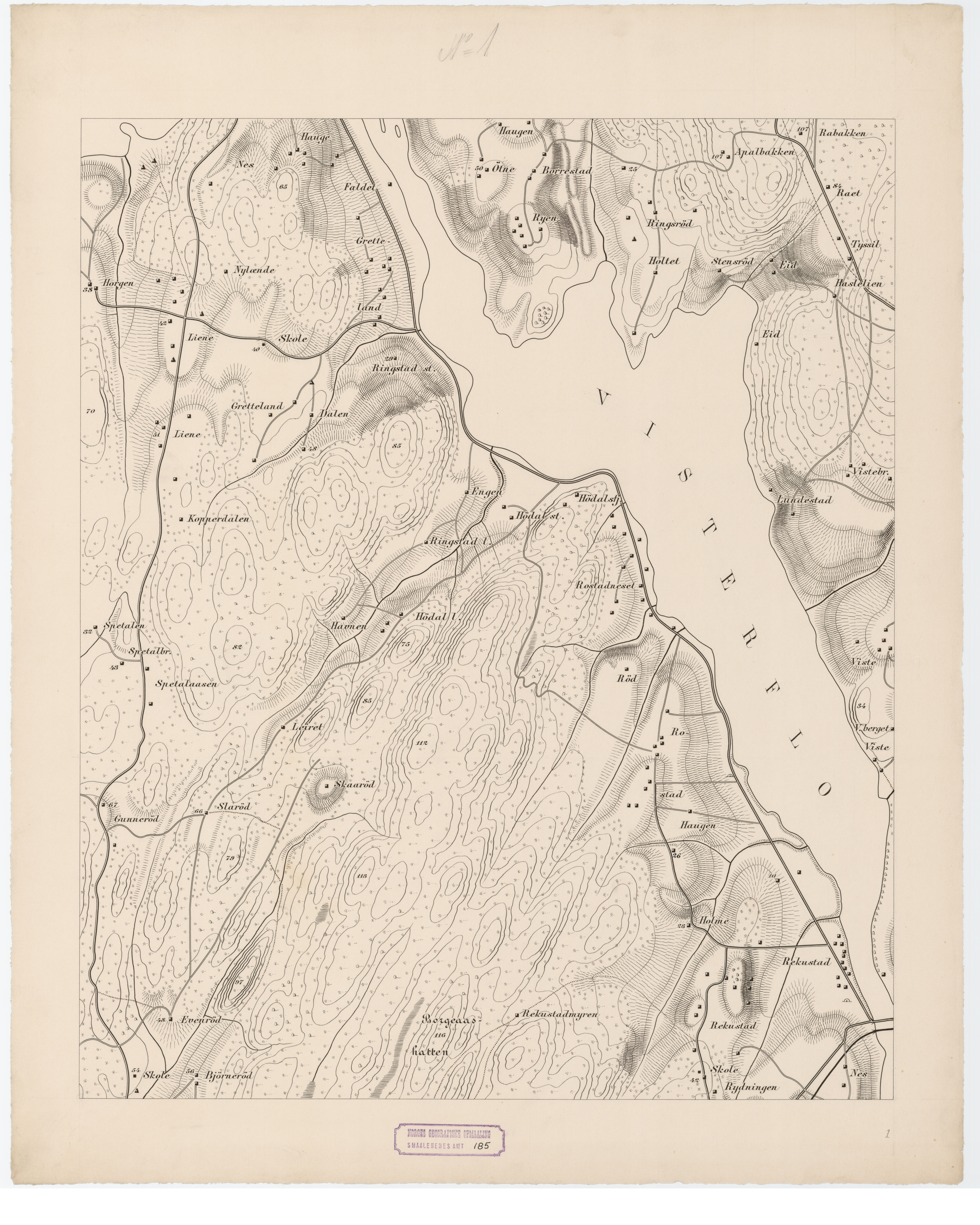
1906 map of Visterflo

Visterflo is a lake in Østfold county, Norway. It forms a part of the Glomma watershed together with Ågårdselva and Mingevannet.

== See also ==
- List of lakes in Norway
