= Lake surfing =

Surfing

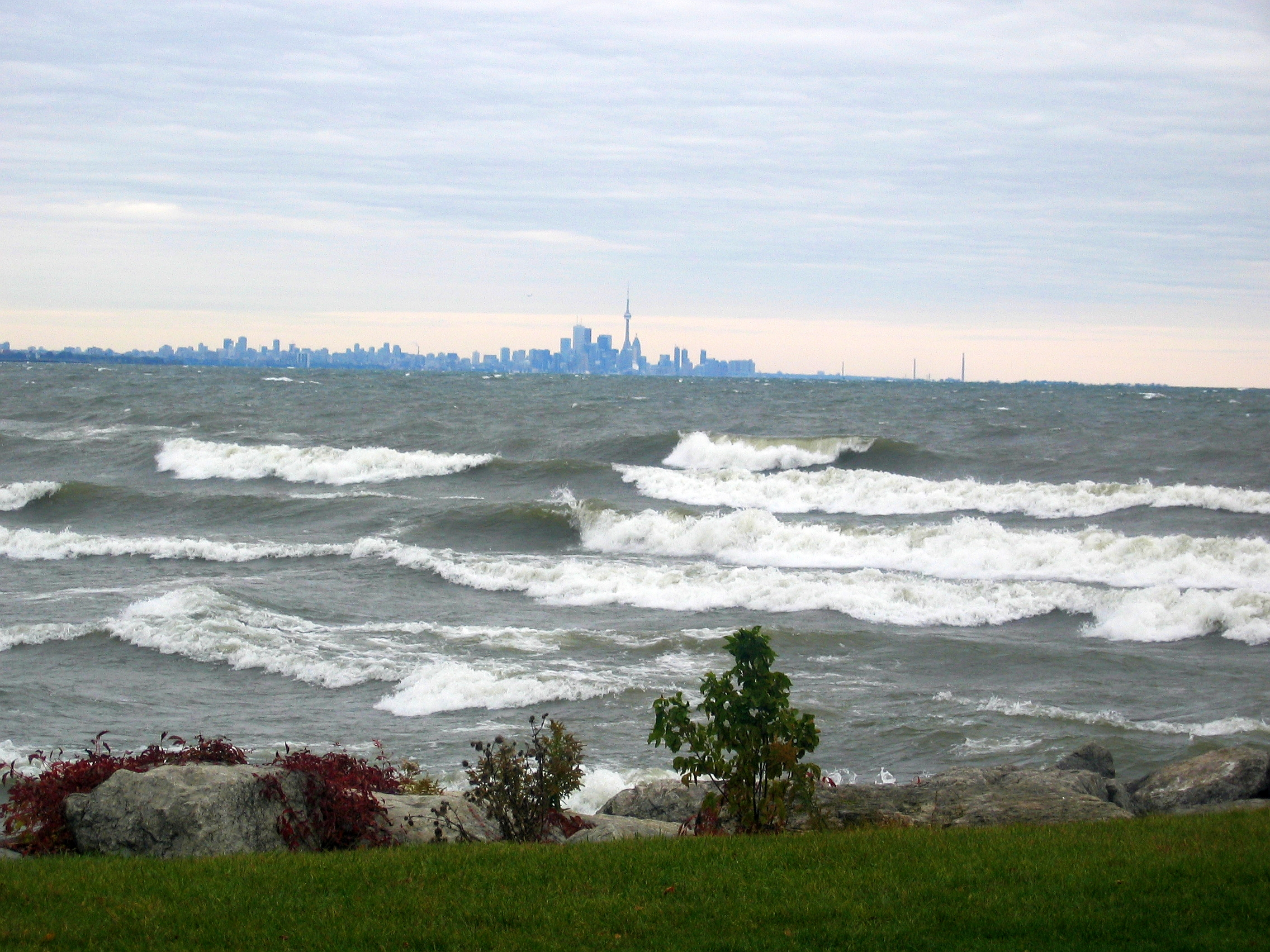
Waves in Lake Ontario with Toronto skyline

Lake surfing is surfing on any lake with sufficient surface area for wind to produce waves. As with ocean surfing, ideal wave conditions are when the wind switches offshore. However, when this occurs over a lake the waves generated by previous onshore wind subside relatively quickly. This means lake surfers have a shorter window of opportunity to surf ideal waves. Lake surfers are often out during and experiencing the same storm that creates the waves whereas ocean surfers are more often surfing on swell produced by storms hundreds of miles away and that may have taken days to reach shore. In addition to making it more difficult to manage surfboards, high winds can make the face of a wave and water surface rough. Increased wave frequency due to shorter fetch results in less rest between waves and sets of waves. This can make it necessary to paddle out through waves because there may not be a long enough pause between sets to paddle out between them.

Though not significant enough to necessitate surfboard design changes, the reduced buoyancy of fresh water results in increased drag when paddling. Lake surfers enjoy water that is fresh ("sweet" as opposed to salty) and do not have to worry about the dangers from marine life (e.g. sharks, jellyfish, etc.) that ocean surfers may have to contend with.

Lakes where surfing is possible include the Great Lakes on the United States–Canada border and Lake Tahoe on the California–Nevada border.

== Great Lakes ==
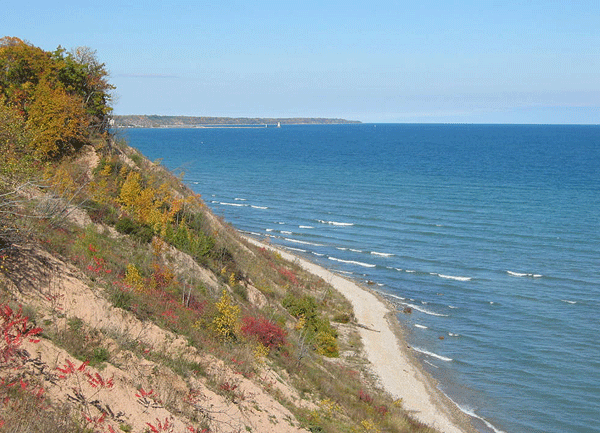
Wave lines in Lake Michigan

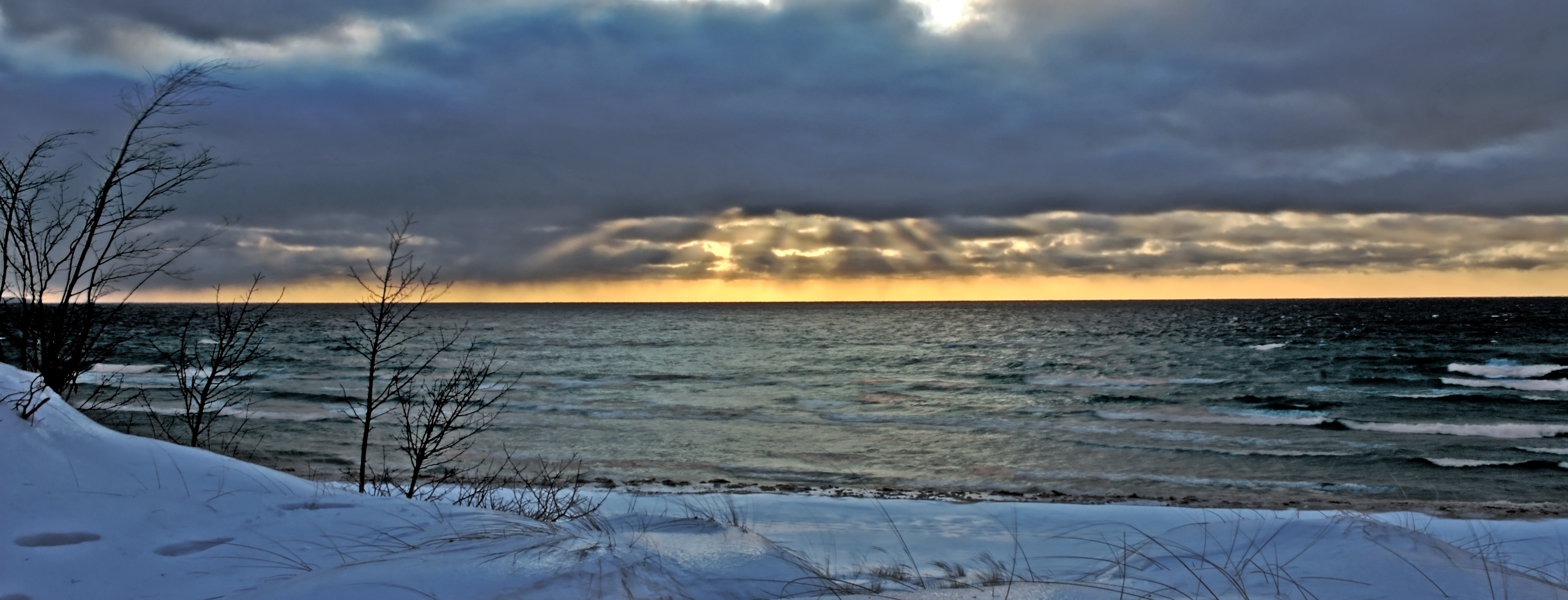
Winter waves in Lake Michigan

Strong storms, particularly in the winter and fall (at which time they may be referred to as a November Witch), can produce large waves on the Great Lakes in North America. During these surf seasons, there is often snow, shelf ice, and some ice in the water, making access difficult and conditions more dangerous. Dedicated surfers wear wetsuits or drysuits to keep warm. The surface water temperature when much Great Lakes surfing occurs averages between 0 and 5 °C (32 and 41 °F).

Sheboygan, Wisconsin, featured in surf films and referred to as the Malibu of the Midwest, hosted an annual Dairyland Surf Classic on Labor Day weekend from 1988 to 2012, which was the largest lake surfing competition in the world.

Great Lakes surfing has grown in popularity over the past decade thanks to the advances in wetsuit and or drysuits technology and the proliferation of information on the internet. There are small surf communities all around the Great Lakes, and medium-sized communities in larger cities such as Toronto and Chicago. Local community organizations such as Great Lakes Surfer's Journal, Surfrider Foundation Milwaukee and Surf the Greats are intended to nurture these communities, protect shorelines, and to raise awareness of Great Lakes surfing. On Lake Ontario’s Canadian shore—including Toronto, Scarborough and Cobourg, Ontario—surfers frequently ride short-period windswells during autumn and winter storms, when strong frontal systems align with local breaks.

== See also ==
- Wyldewood Surf Club
- River surfing
