= Habitat 67 (standing wave) =

Standing wave in the Lachine Rapids

Coordinates: 45°30′01″N 73°32′32″W

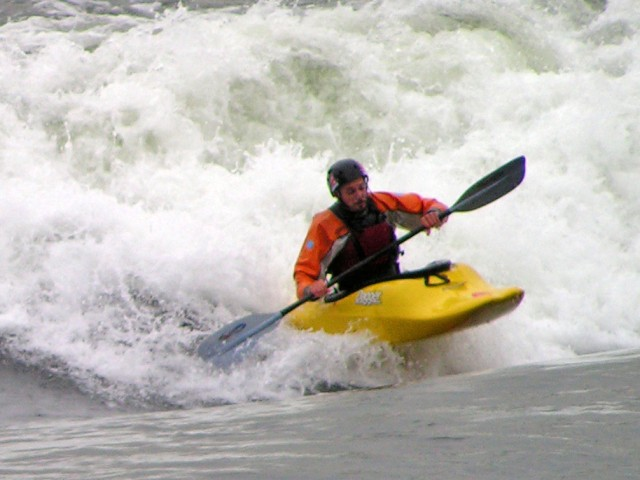
Playboater surfing Habitat 67

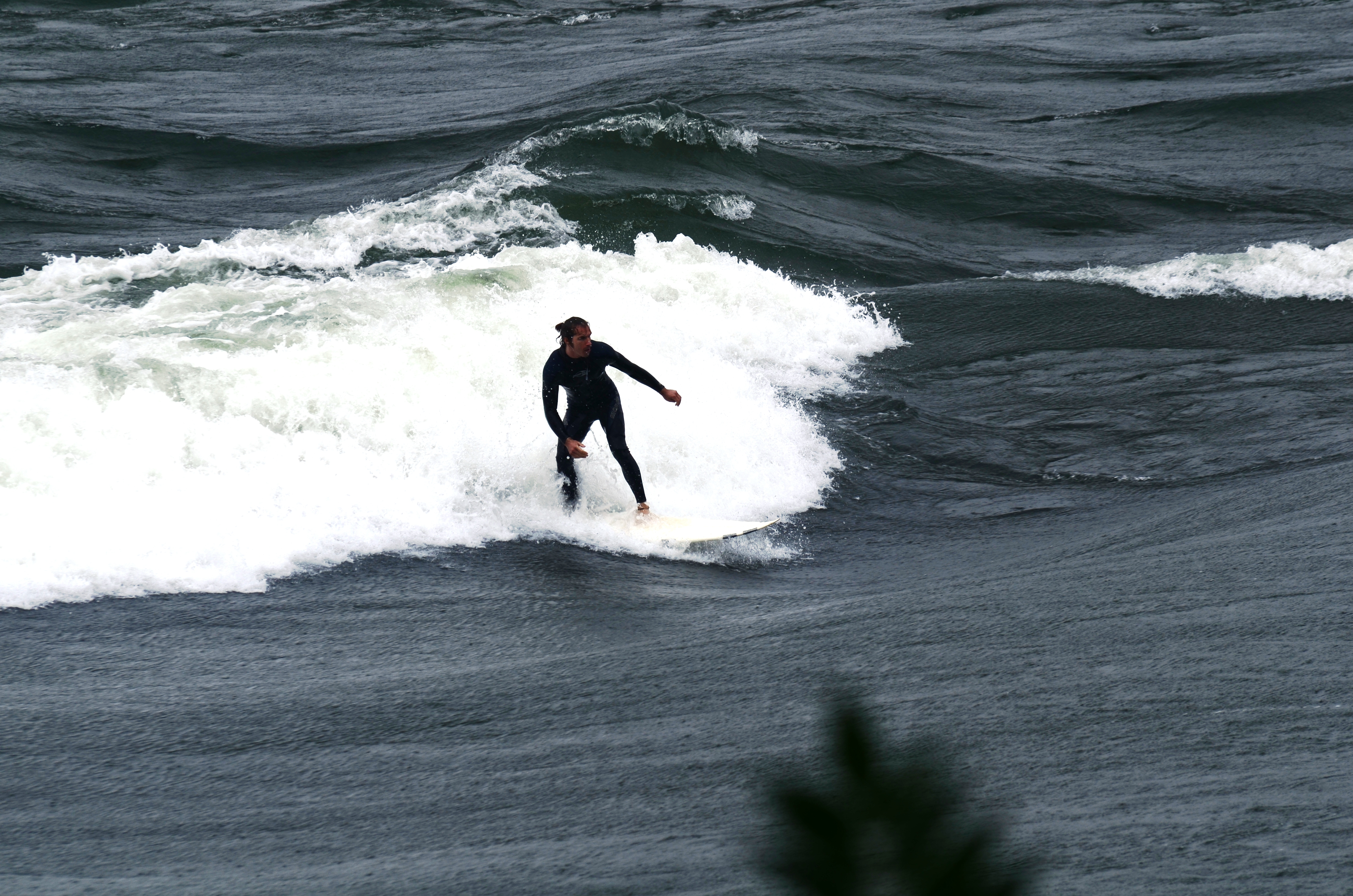
Riversurfing Habitat 67

Habitat 67 is the name of a standing wave on the Saint Lawrence River in Montreal, Quebec, Canada. Informally named for the adjacent Habitat 67 housing complex, it has become a popular destination for whitewater kayaking and river surfing.

The wave is created by fast-moving water hitting underwater boulders. This creates a wave that can reach a height of 2 metres (6 ft 7 in). The Lachine Rapids feature other two-metre breaks, including a wave further upriver near Lachine, known locally as Big Joe.

Corran Addison, an Olympic kayaker and three-time world freestyle kayak champion, was the first to surf the Habitat wave in 2002. His river-surfing school, Imagine Surfboards, has taught 3,500 students since 2005. A second Montreal river-surfing school, KSF, has hosted 1,500 students a year since 2003. From fewer than ten original surfers, it is estimated that there are currently around 500 participants.
