= Eisbach (Isar) =

Manmade river in Munich

Coordinates: 48°08′48″N 11°35′27″E

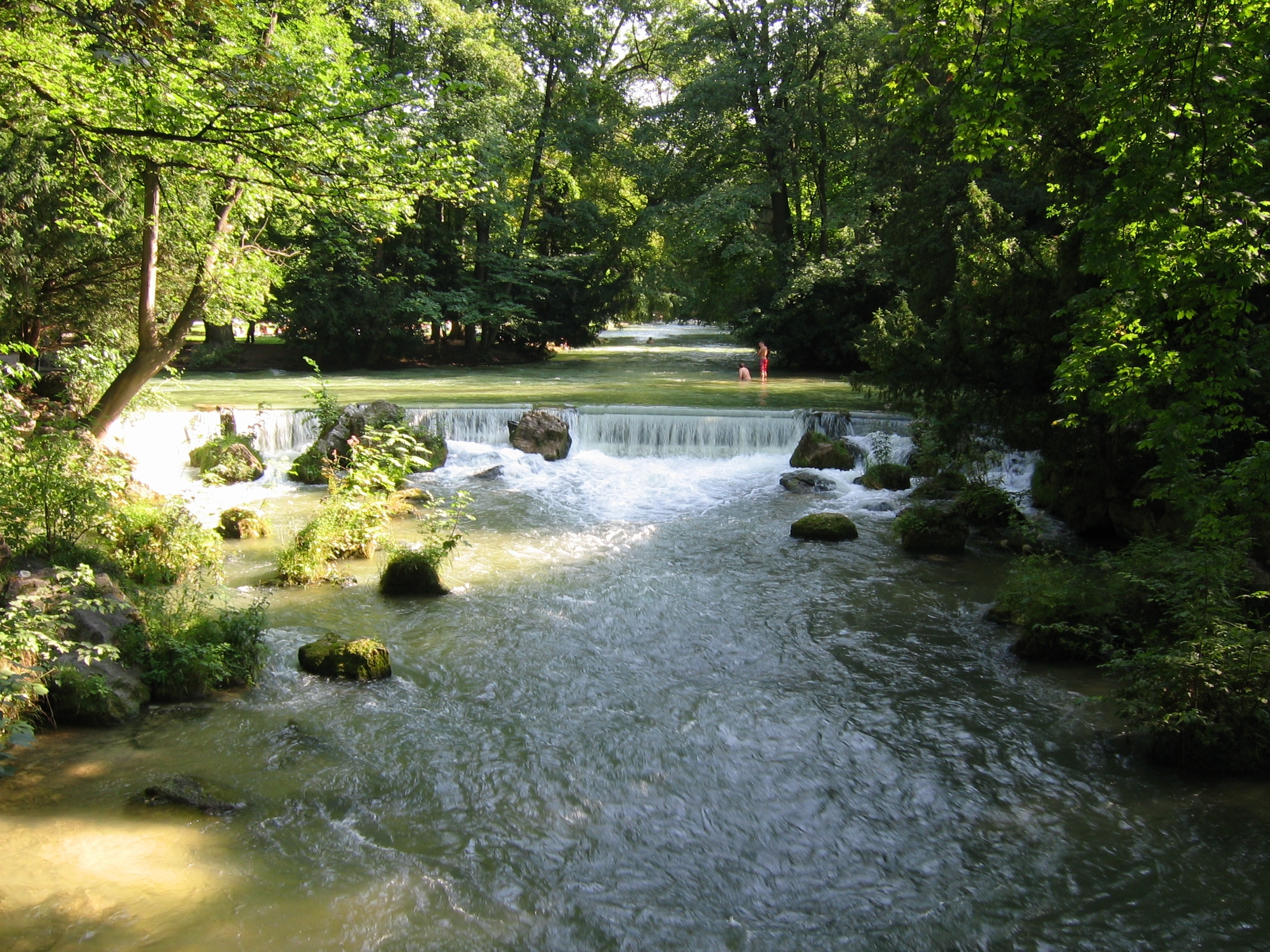
- Small waterfall of the Eisbach

Location
- Country: Germany
- State: Bavaria

Physical characteristics
- Length: 2 km (1.2 mi)

Surfing video

The Eisbach (German pronunciation: [ˈaɪsbax]) is a 2-kilometre-long (1.2 mi) canal, part of Munich City Streams in Munich, Germany. It flows through the Englischer Garten park, and is a side arm of the Isar River. An artificial wave has been created on one section, which is popular among river surfers.

Swimming in the Eisbach is not technically allowed, but as the rule is not stringently enforced, swimmers are common, especially on warm summer days. However, swimming in the cold, fast stream is dangerous: Between 2007 and 2017, eight people drowned in the Eisbach.

== Surfing ==
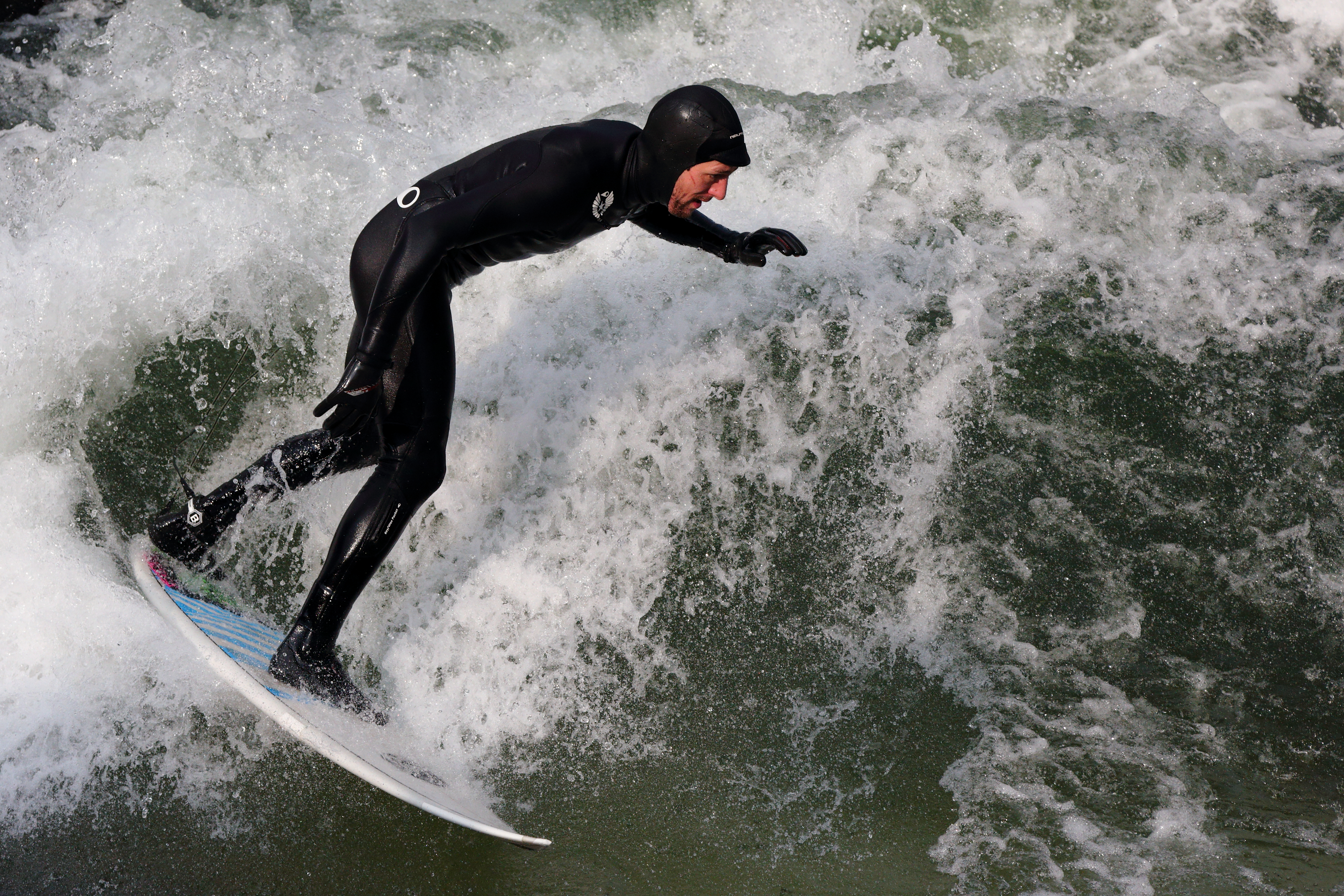
Eisbach surfer

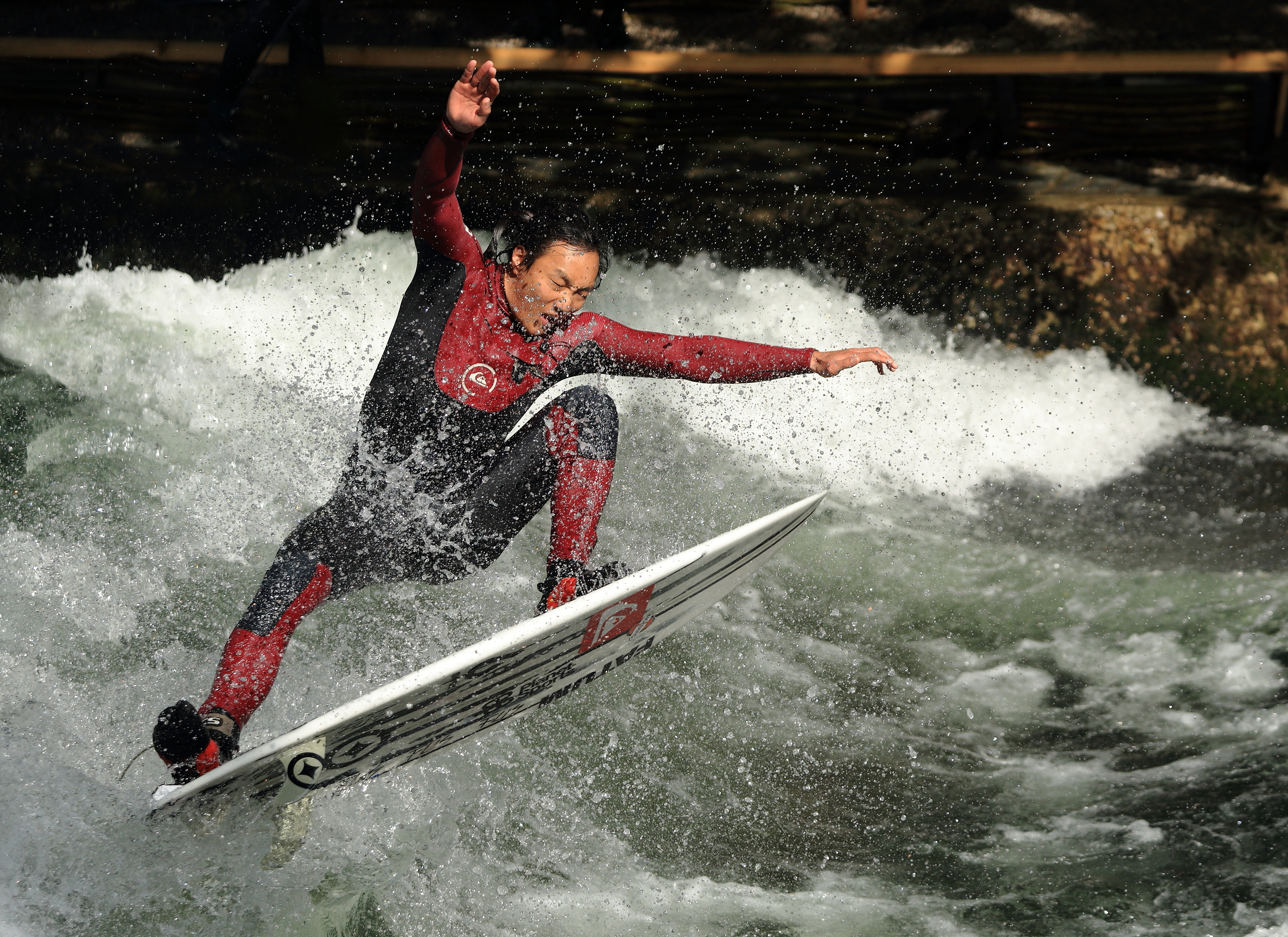
Springtime

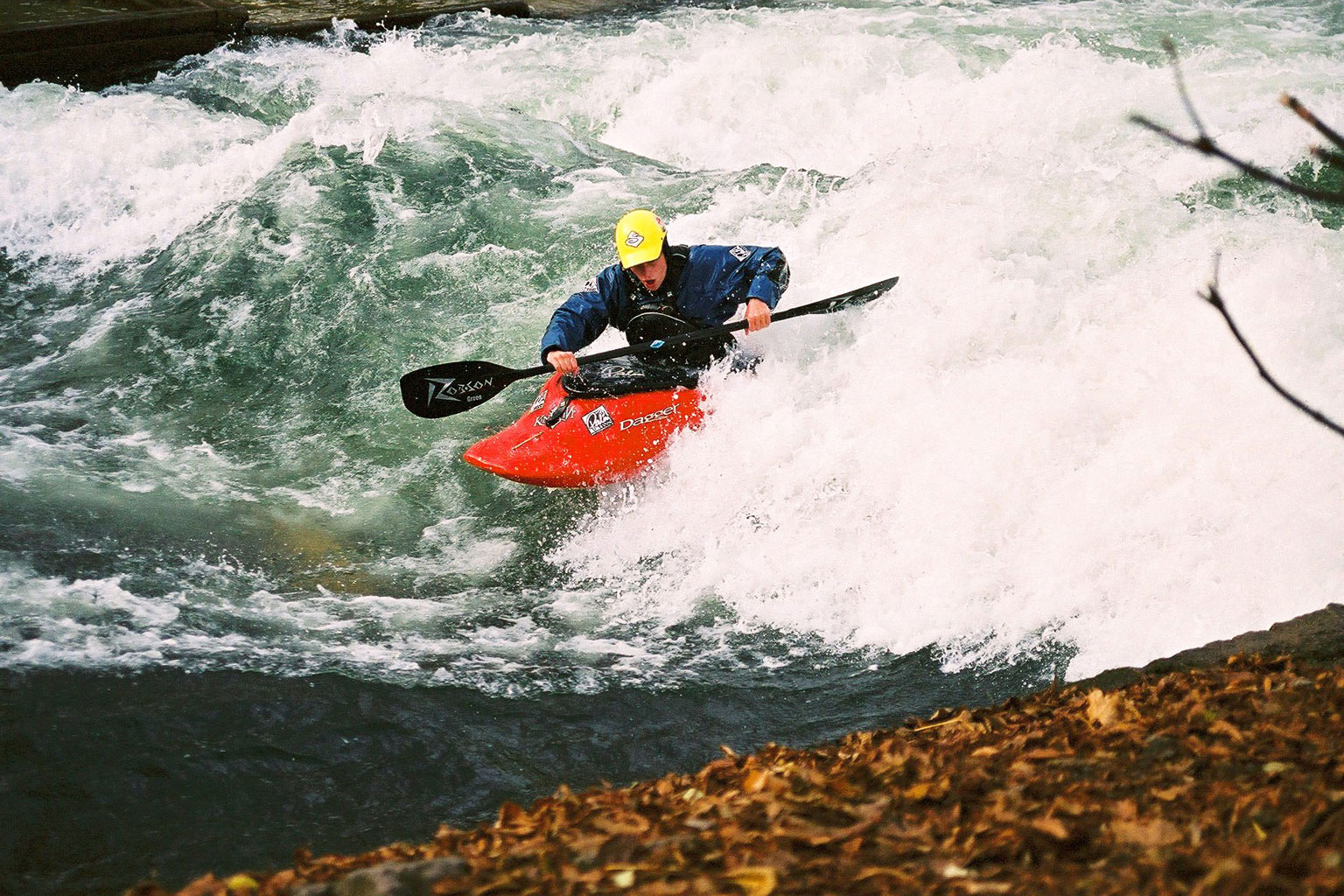
Playboater on the Eisbach

Right after the bridge near the Haus der Kunst art museum, the flowing water forms a standing wave dubbed Eisbachwelle ('Eisbach wave'). The wave is about one metre high and is a popular river surfing spot. The water is cold and shallow—sometimes only 40 cm deep—making it only suitable for experienced surfers and playboaters (whitewater kayakers). The wave is predominantly used by surfers, and animosities of surfers towards kayakers have occasionally been reported.

The wave has been surfed by river surfers since 1972, "Dieter Deventer has been doing this since 1973". Surfing competitions have even been held. Due to the more recent development of playboating, kayakers have only more recently—and so far not in great numbers—started to surf the wave.

Since 2010 surfing has been officially permitted on the river. A new sign next to the wave warns that "Due to the forceful current, the wave is suitable for skilled and experienced surfers only." In previous years there has been an issue between the authorities, who threatened to remove the wave, and a group of wave supporters who organized activities and a website to save the wave, including an online petition to leave the wave intact.

Being a standing wave, it can be surfed for as long as one's balance holds, and in busy times a queue of surfers forms on the bank. In the past surfers tied a leash to the bridge to hold onto, but a sign announces that this is both dangerous and forbidden.

The local surfers have forced the wave to break more cleanly, with increased height, by attaching ropes to the bridge which trail submerged planks, creating two large "U"-shapes. Such a shape makes the wave easier to surf for river surfers (playboating makes fewer demands of the wave shape).

In November 2025, following an annual dredging, the wave disappeared, with city officials and surfers working together to figure out the cause. A December 2025 attempt by surfing activists to reinstate the wave was thwarted by the city authorities, who removed a beam that had been installed.

There is a second standing wave on the Eisbach (E2 Kleine Eisbachwelle) located a few hundred meters downstream, further north, in the Englischer Garten. The Eisbach is wider at this point, so the water flows more slowly and the wave is less demanding, which results in the wave being used by beginners to develop their surfing skills. Another wave for beginners is in Floßlände near the Thalkirchen U-Bahn station. It has also been surfed since 1972, and it is wide enough to take a few surfers at a time. A fourth standing wave in Munich forms on the Isar itself near the bridge Wittelsbacherbrücke, but only at flood levels of the river. Due to the dirt, manure, and objects such as tree branches drifting in the floodwater in the first days after flooding, this wave is usually only surfed a few days after the water level has risen.

== Swimming ==
Although the authorities do not strictly enforce the swimming ban, they caution against the dangers even for experienced swimmers: the Eisbach has a very strong current and no fixed exit points, which makes it hard to get out again. Hence, swimmers sometimes float too far and get stuck in the lattice behind the Tivoli bridge before the hydroelectric power plant, where they must be rescued. Also, the Eisbach is shallow, which can lead to injuries not only when jumping in, but while swimming, because obstacles like stones, broken glass and dumped bicycles can be found on its bed. Lastly, the ordinarily cold water harbors the risk of hypothermia.

== See also ==
- River surfing in Germany
- List of rivers in Bavaria
