= Schwabinger Bach =

River in Bavaria, Germany

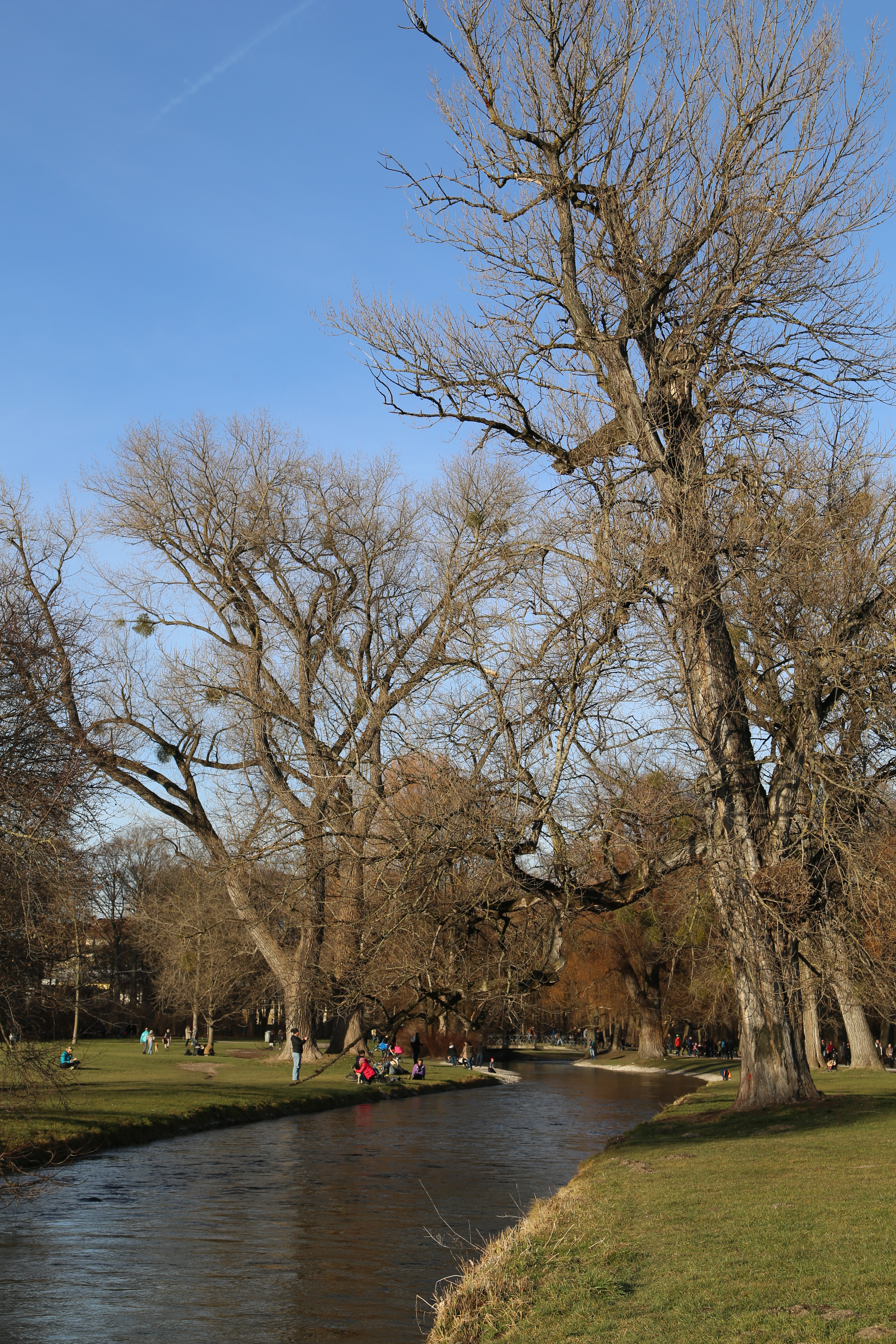
- The Schwabinger Bach on a sunny winter day

Location
- Country: Germany
- State: Bavaria

Physical characteristics
- Mouth
  - location: Isar
  - coordinates: 48.2414°N 11.6734°E
- Length: 16.4 km (10.2 mi)

Basin features
- Progression: Isar→ Danube→ Black Sea

Schwabinger Bach is a stream in Bavaria, Germany. It starts in the centre of Munich, flows through the Englischer Garten and flows into the Isar near Garching bei München.

== Photos ==
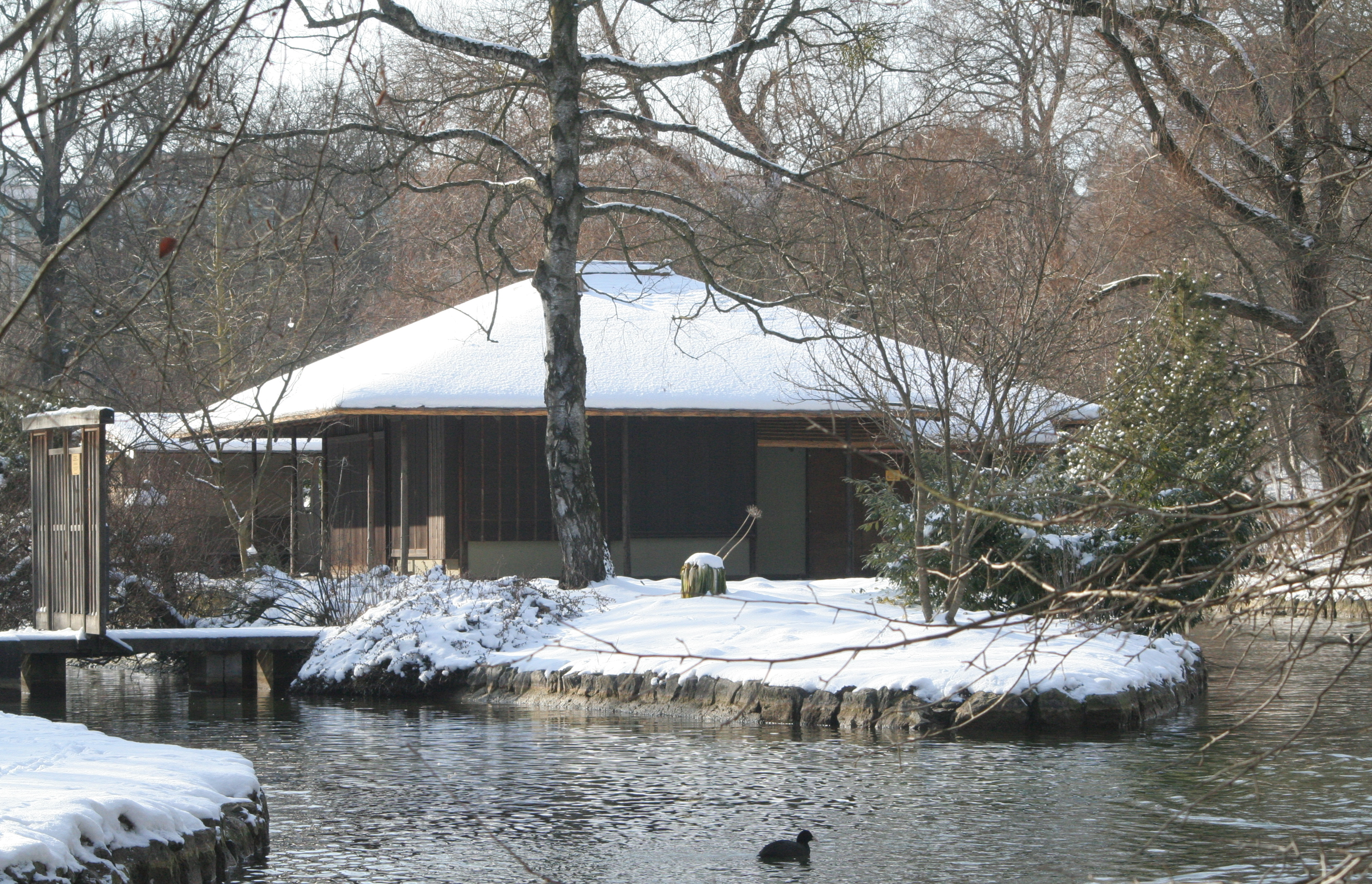
Schwabinger Bach brook at the Japanese teahouse

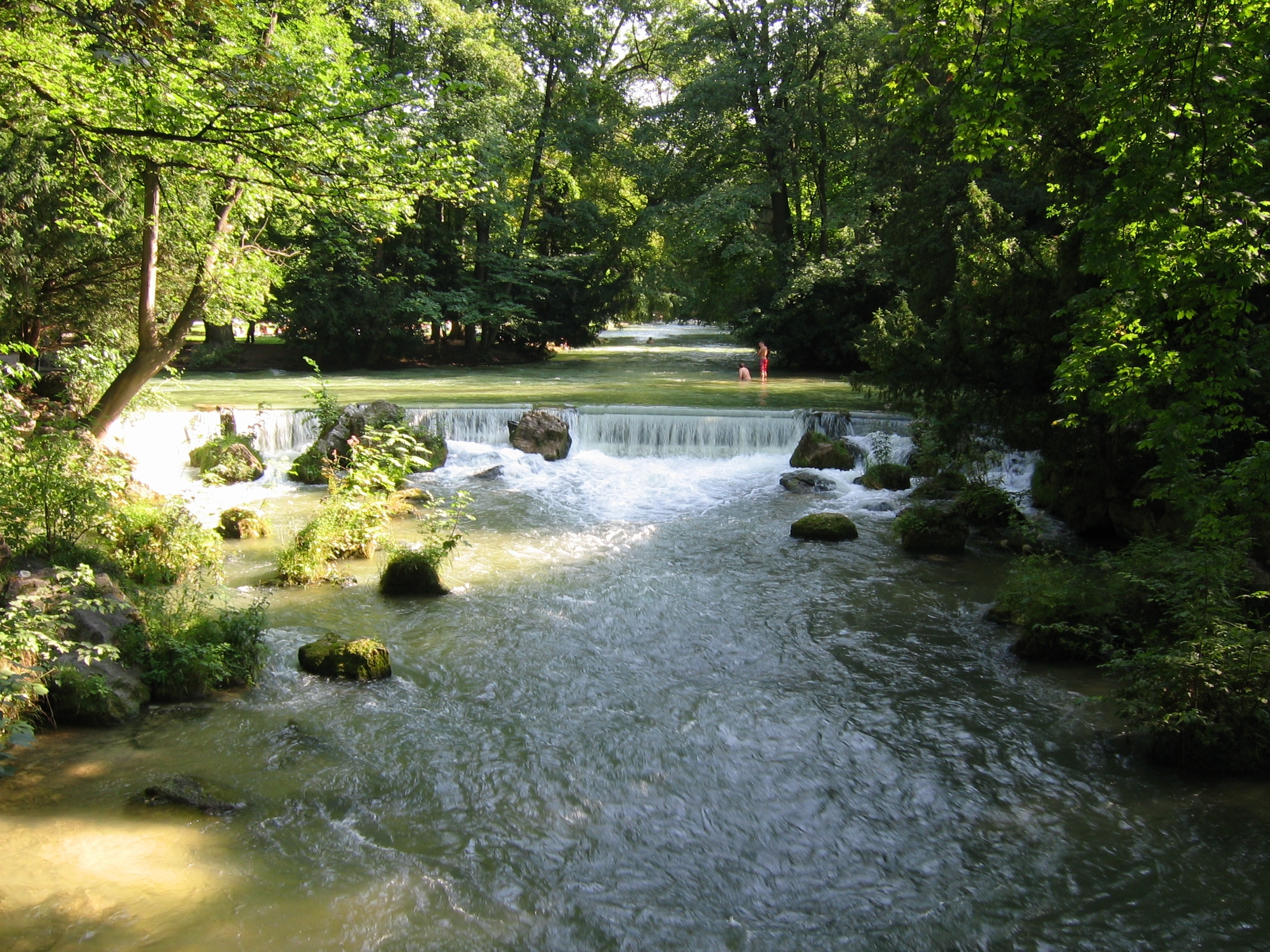
Eisbach and Schwabinger Bach

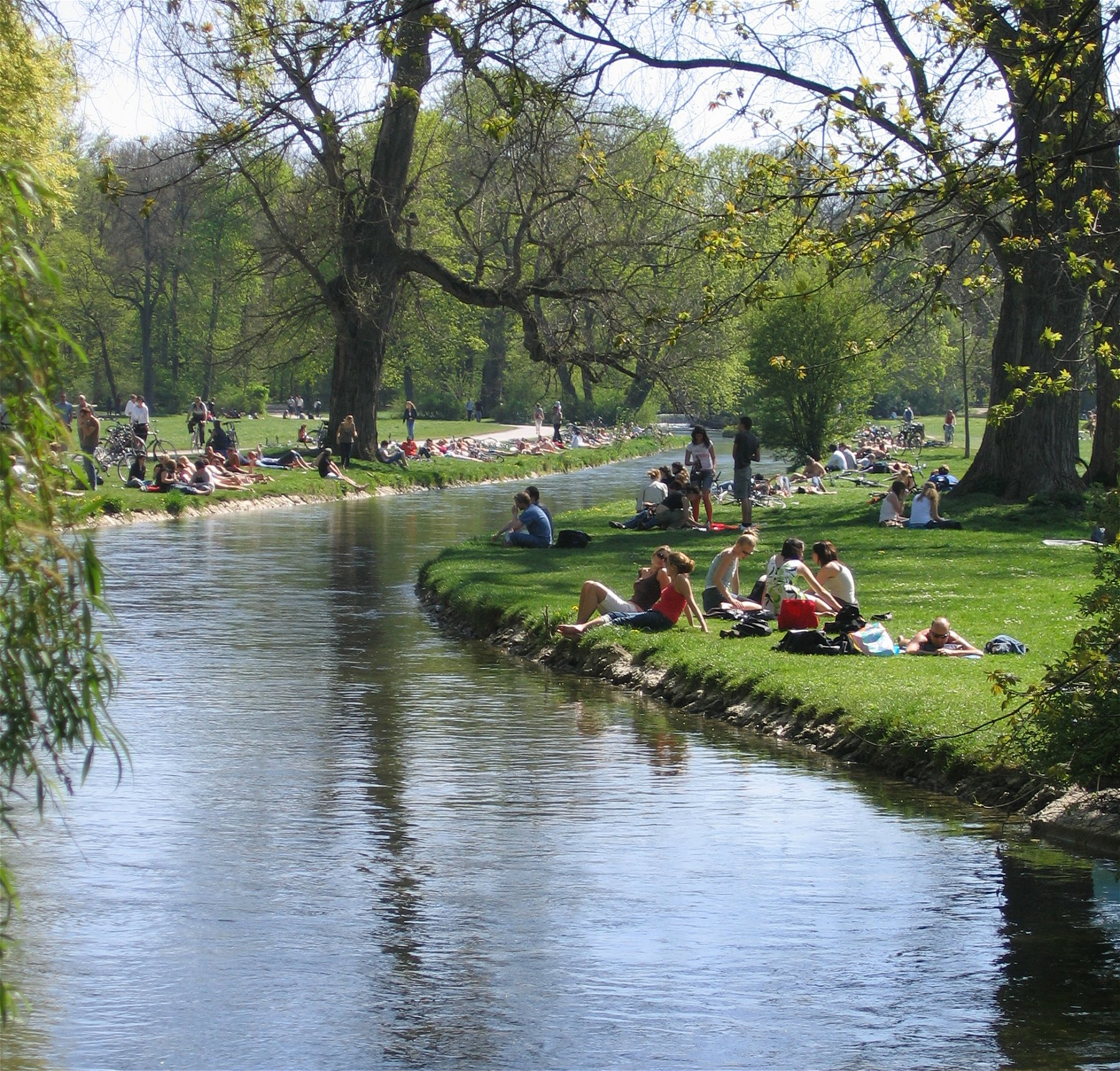
Schwabinger Bach, view south

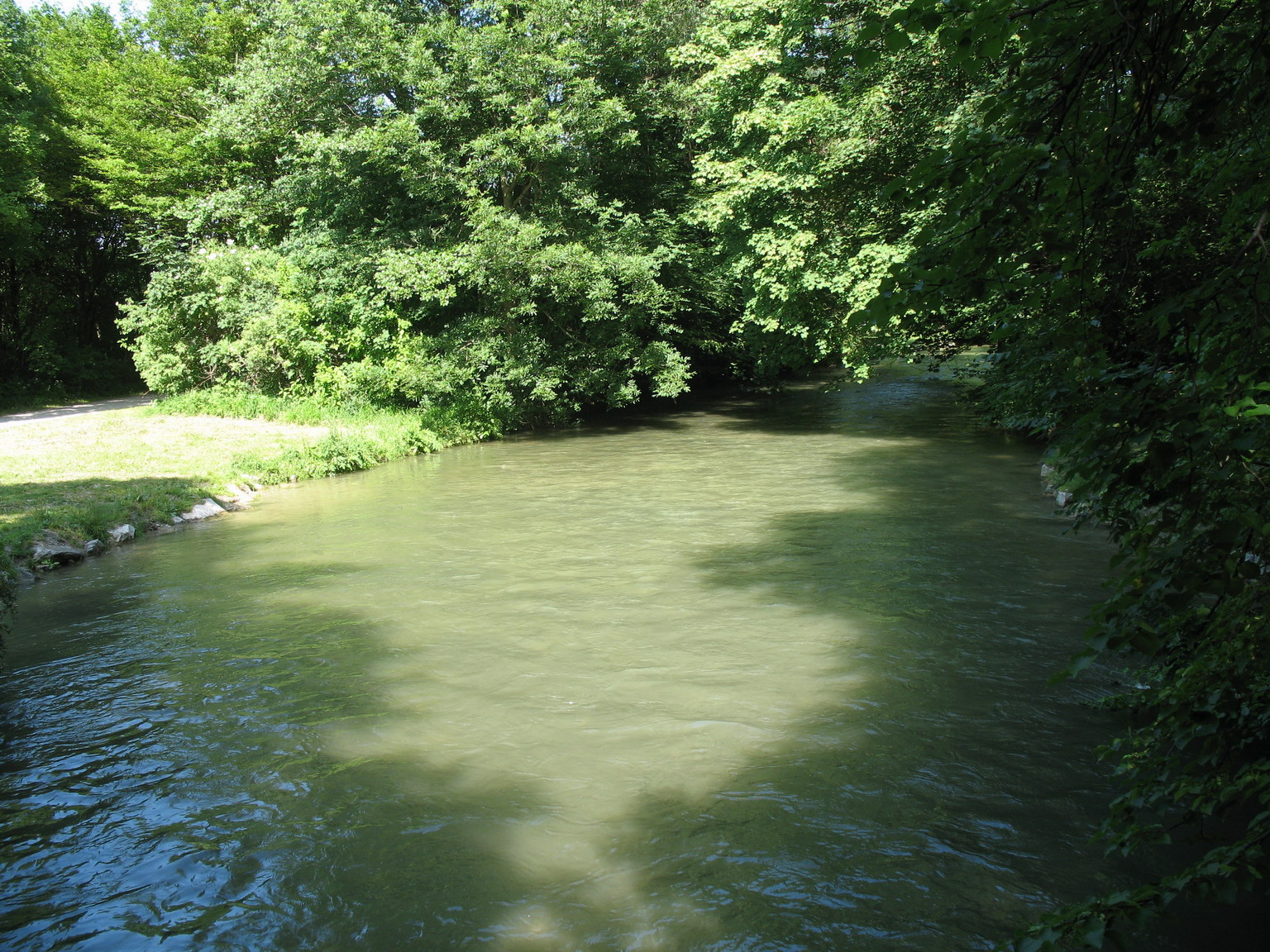
Schwabinger Bach in the Hirschau

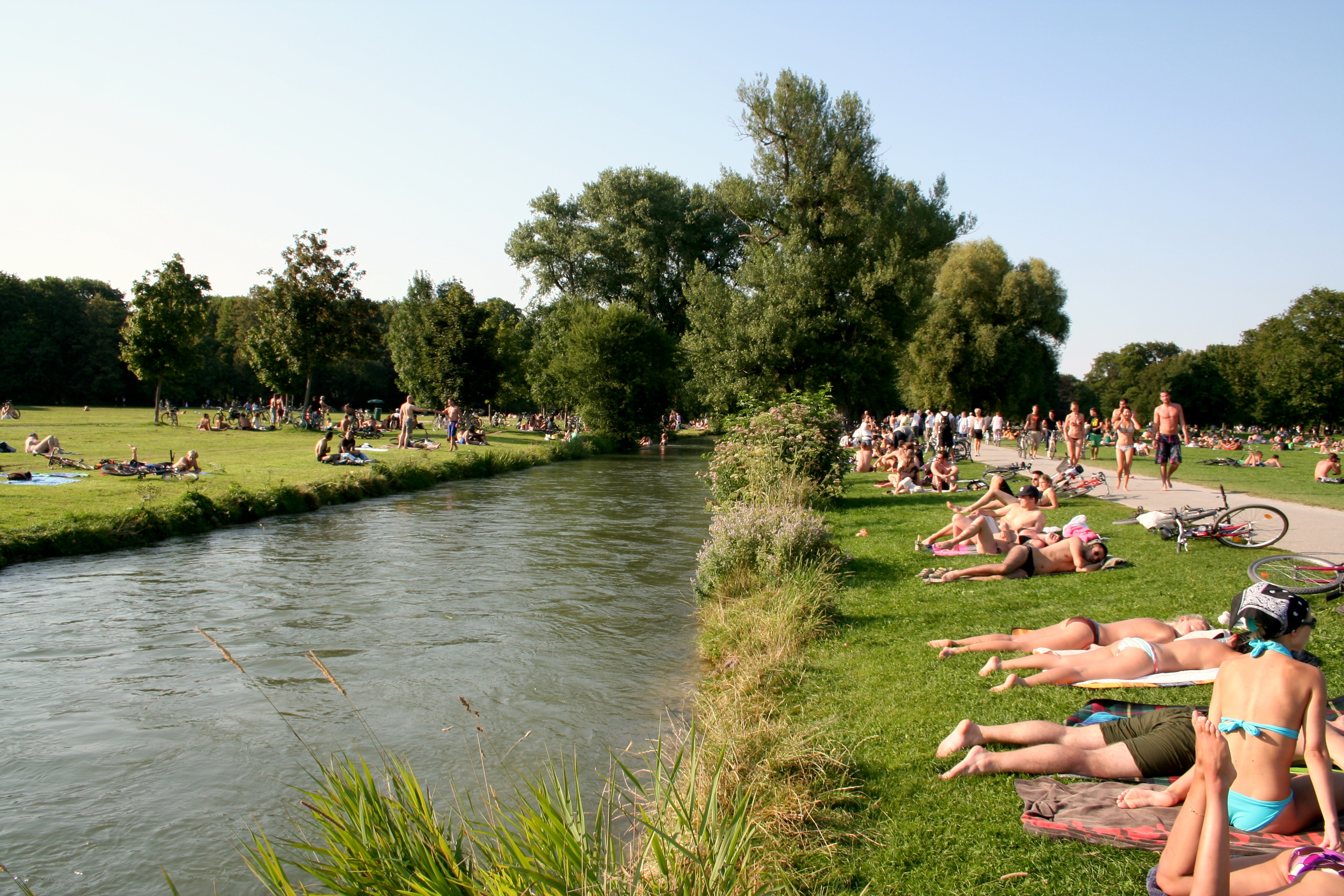
Schwabinger Bach at the height of summer

== See also ==
- List of rivers of Bavaria
